= Roccavivara =

- Comune
- Comune di Roccavivara
- Location within Italy Location within Molise
- Coordinates: 41°50′N 14°36′E
- Country: Italy
- Region: Molise
- Province: Campobasso (CB)

Government
  - Mayor: Franco Antenucci

Area
  - Total: 21.05 km^{2} (8.13 sq mi)
- Elevation: 652 m (2,139 ft)

Population (30 November 2017)
  - Total: 805
  - Density: 38.2/km^{2} (99.0/sq mi)
- Demonym: Rocchesi
- Time zone: UTC+1 (CET)
  - Summer (DST): UTC+2 (CEST)
- Postal code: 86020
- Dialing code: 0874
- Website: Official website

Roccavivara is a comune (municipality) in the Province of Campobasso in the Italian region Molise, located about 30 kilometres (19 mi) north of Campobasso.

Roccavivara borders the following municipalities: Castelguidone, Castelmauro, Celenza sul Trigno, Montefalcone nel Sannio, San Giovanni Lipioni, Trivento.
