= Tollo =

- Comune
- Comune di Tollo
- Location within Italy Location within Abruzzo
- Coordinates: 42°20′N 14°19′E
- Country: Italy
- Region: Abruzzo
- Province: Chieti (CH)
- Frazioni: Colle, Colle Cavalieri, Colle della Signora, Colle Secco, Macchie, Motrino, Pedine, Piano Mozzone, Sabatiniello, San Pietro, Santa Lucia, Venna

Area
  - Total: 14.88 km^{2} (5.75 sq mi)
- Elevation: 152 m (499 ft)

Population (2008)
  - Total: 4,237
  - Density: 284.7/km^{2} (737.5/sq mi)
- Demonym: Tollesi
- Time zone: UTC+1 (CET)
  - Summer (DST): UTC+2 (CEST)
- Postal code: 66010
- Dialing code: 0871
- ISTAT code: 069090
- Patron saint: Santa Maria del Rosario, San Pasquale, Santa Marina, San Rocco, Santa Lucia
- Saint day: first Sunday in August, 17 May, 17 July, 16 August, 13 December
- Website: Official website

Tollo is a comune and town in the Province of Chieti in the Abruzzo region of Italy. Tollo is renowned for its vineyards and olive groves. It is situated in the 'Hills of the Teatina' (colline teatine), a group of foothills of the Apennines, with a view of the Adriatic sea to the east, and a view of the Maiella Mountain, the second highest peak in middle Italy, to the west.

== Geography ==
Tollo is the name given to both the territory (comune) and the town. The comune borders Canosa Sannita, Crecchio, Giuliano Teatino, Miglianico, and Ortona. The territory also comprises 12 frazioni or hamlets: Colle, Colle Cavalieri, Colle della Signora, Colle Secco, Macchie, Motrino, Pedine, Piana Mozzone, Sabatiniello, San Pietro, Santa Lucia, Venna.

Tollo is renowned for its vineyards and olive groves.

== Culture ==
The city of Tollo is host to a variety of well-attended events throughout the year; religious, athletic, and historical, drawing regional crowds.

Cultural events include the re-enactment of the siege of the Turks, a festival that occurs on the first Sunday in August; the Passion of the Christ performance in Easter; and the Procession of the Symbols on Good Friday. Each April, the city of Tollo hosts a 130 km bicycling competition, one of the "Tour of Italy' qualifying races. This race traverses the foothills of the Apennines, with grades from 5% to 11%. It is attended by well over 1000 participants annually. There is a long (130 km) and short course (89 km).
