= Tufillo =

- Comune
- Comune di Tufillo
- Location within Italy Location within Abruzzo
- Coordinates: 41°55′N 14°37′E
- Country: Italy
- Region: Abruzzo
- Province: Chieti (CH)
- Frazioni: Celenza sul Trigno, Dogliola, Mafalda (CB), Montemitro (CB), Palmoli, San Felice del Molise (CB)

Area
  - Total: 21 km^{2} (8.1 sq mi)
- Elevation: 578 m (1,896 ft)

Population (1 January 2007)
  - Total: 508
  - Density: 24/km^{2} (63/sq mi)
- Demonym: Tufillesi
- Time zone: UTC+1 (CET)
  - Summer (DST): UTC+2 (CEST)
- Postal code: 66050
- Dialing code: 0873
- ISTAT code: 069097
- Patron saint: San Vito Santa Giusta
- Saint day: 15 June

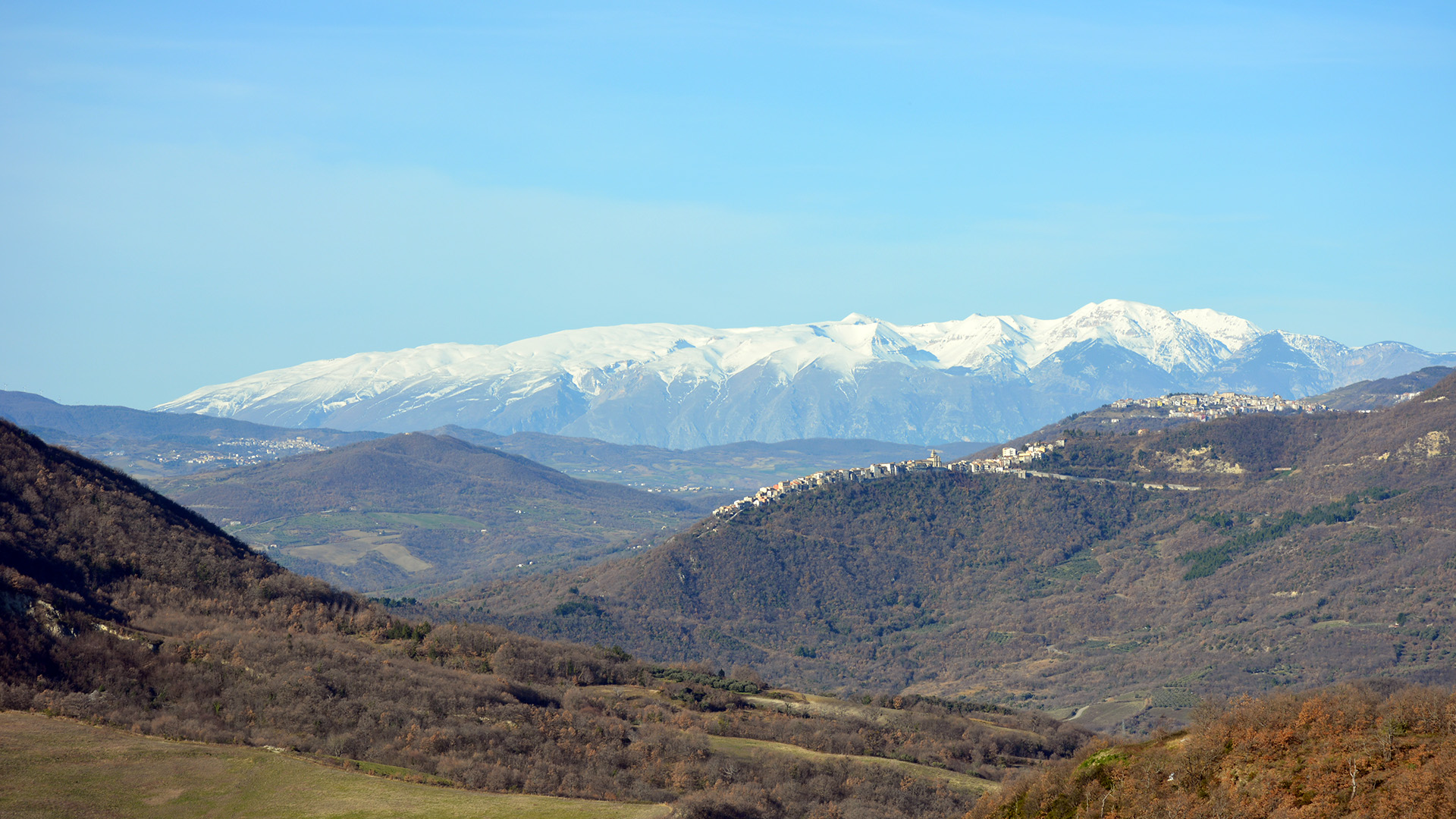

Tufillo (Abruzzese: Tufìlle, Tufùlle) is a comune and town in the Province of Chieti in the Abruzzo region of Italy. It has a population of approximately 508.
