= Giovanni Boccardi =

Giovanni Boccardi may refer to:

- Giovanni Boccardi (painter) (died 1542), Italian miniature painter
- Giovanni Boccardi (astronomer) (1859–1936), Italian astronomer, mathematician, and priest
