= Liscia =

- Comune
- Comune di Liscia
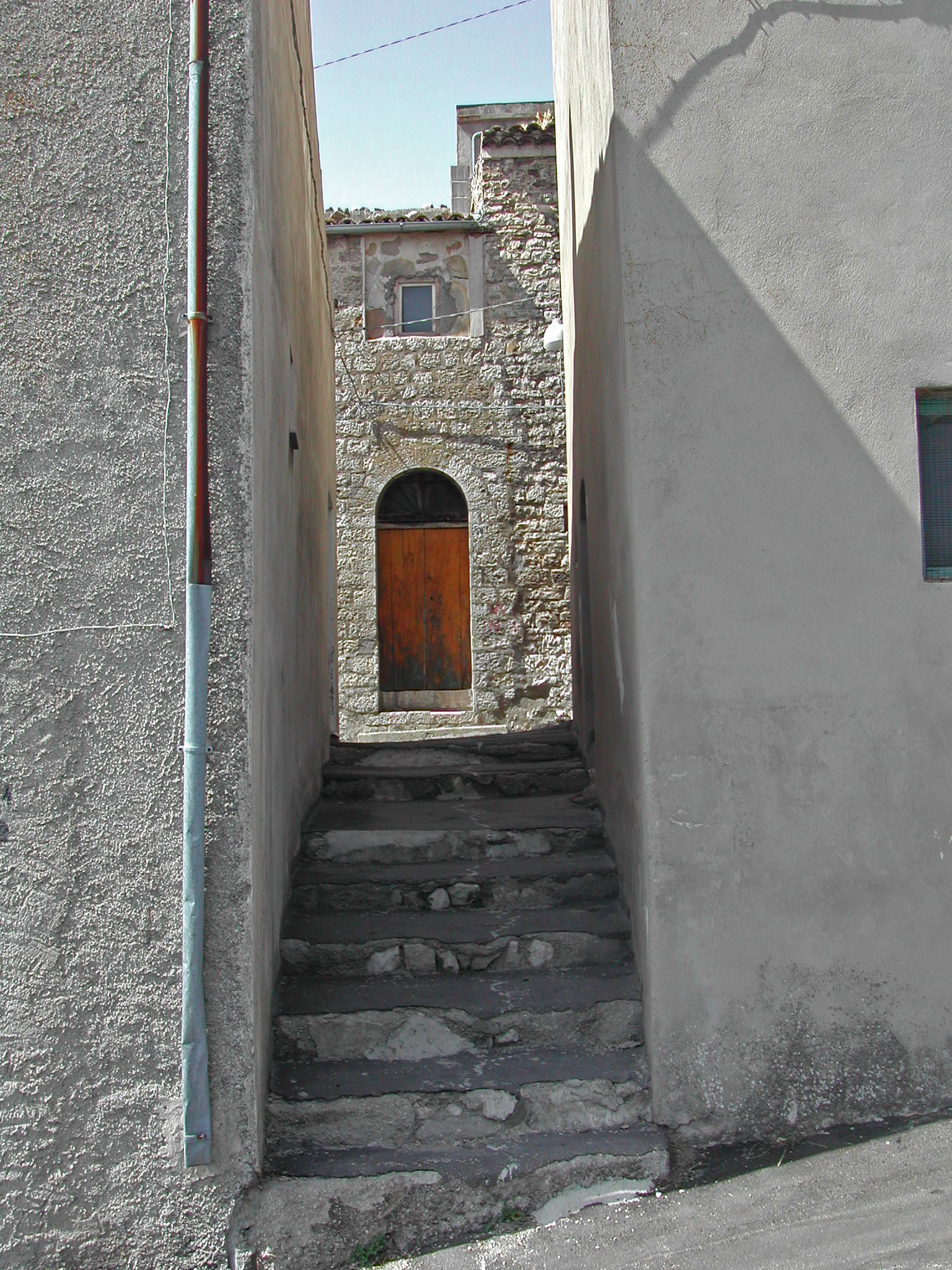
- Street in Liscia

- Location within Italy Location within Abruzzo
- Coordinates: 41°57′N 14°34′E
- Country: Italy
- Region: Abruzzo
- Province: Chieti (CH)
- Frazioni: Carpineto Sinello, Carunchio, Palmoli, San Buono

Area
  - Total: 8.02 km^{2} (3.10 sq mi)
- Elevation: 740 m (2,430 ft)

Population (2008)
  - Total: 770
  - Density: 96/km^{2} (250/sq mi)
- Demonym: Lisciani
- Time zone: UTC+1 (CET)
  - Summer (DST): UTC+2 (CEST)
- Postal code: 66050
- Dialing code: 0873
- ISTAT code: 069049
- Patron saint: San Michele Arcangelo
- Saint day: 29 September and 8 May

Liscia (Abruzzese: Le Lìsce) is a comune (municipality) and town in the Province of Chieti in the Abruzzo region of Italy.
