= Fraine =

- Comune
- Comune di Fraine
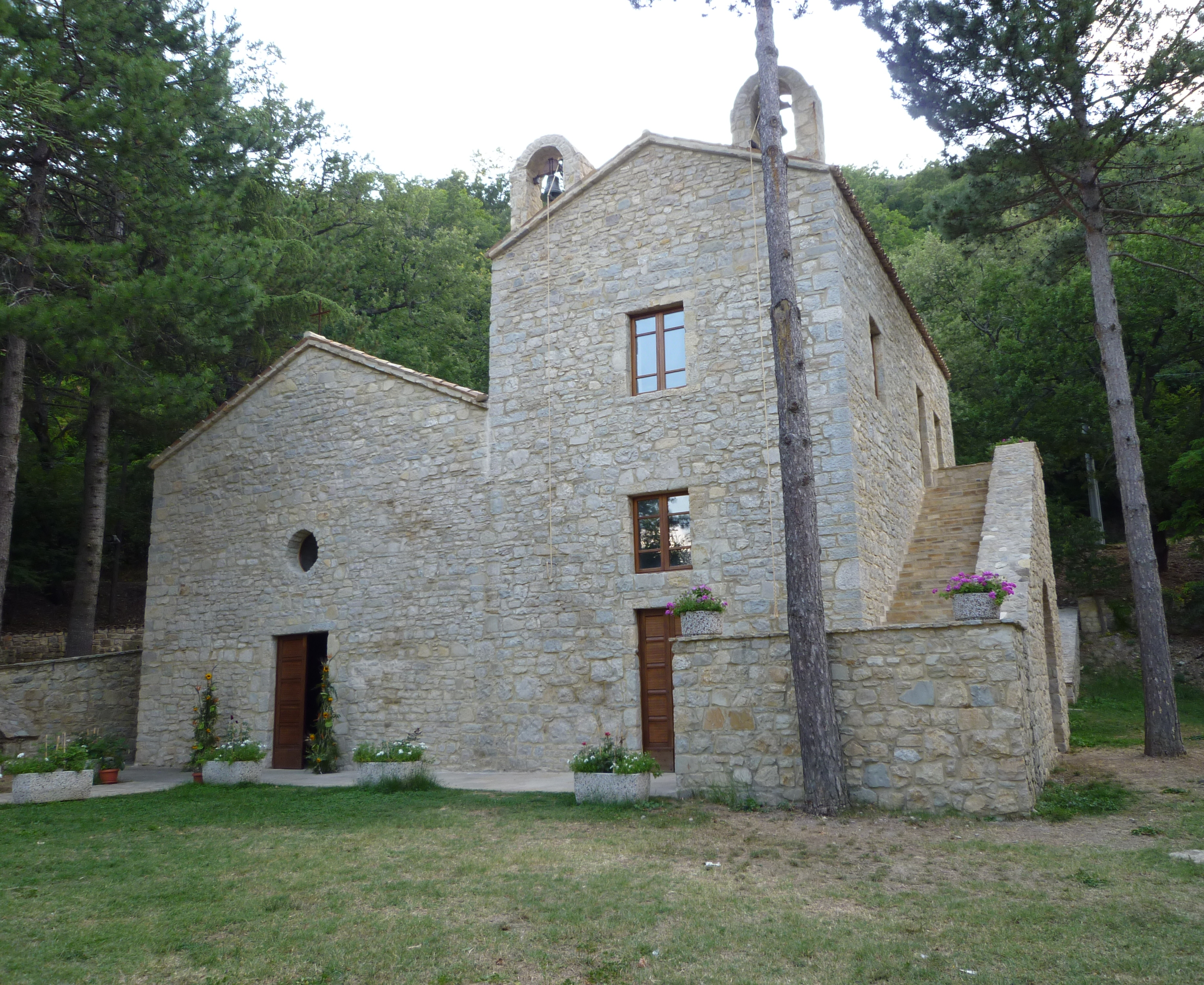
- The sanctuary of Santa Maria Mater Domini

- Coat of arms

- Location within Italy Location within Abruzzo
- Coordinates: 41°55′N 14°29′E
- Country: Italy
- Region: Abruzzo
- Province: Chieti (CH)
- Frazioni: Carunchio, Castiglione Messer Marino, Roccaspinalveti

Government
  - Mayor: Filippo Stampone

Area
  - Total: 16 km^{2} (6.2 sq mi)
- Elevation: 751 m (2,464 ft)

Population (2018-01-01)
  - Total: 463
  - Density: 29/km^{2} (75/sq mi)
- Demonym: Frainesi
- Time zone: UTC+1 (CET)
  - Summer (DST): UTC+2 (CEST)
- Postal code: 66050
- Dialing code: 0873
- ISTAT code: 069034
- Website: Official website

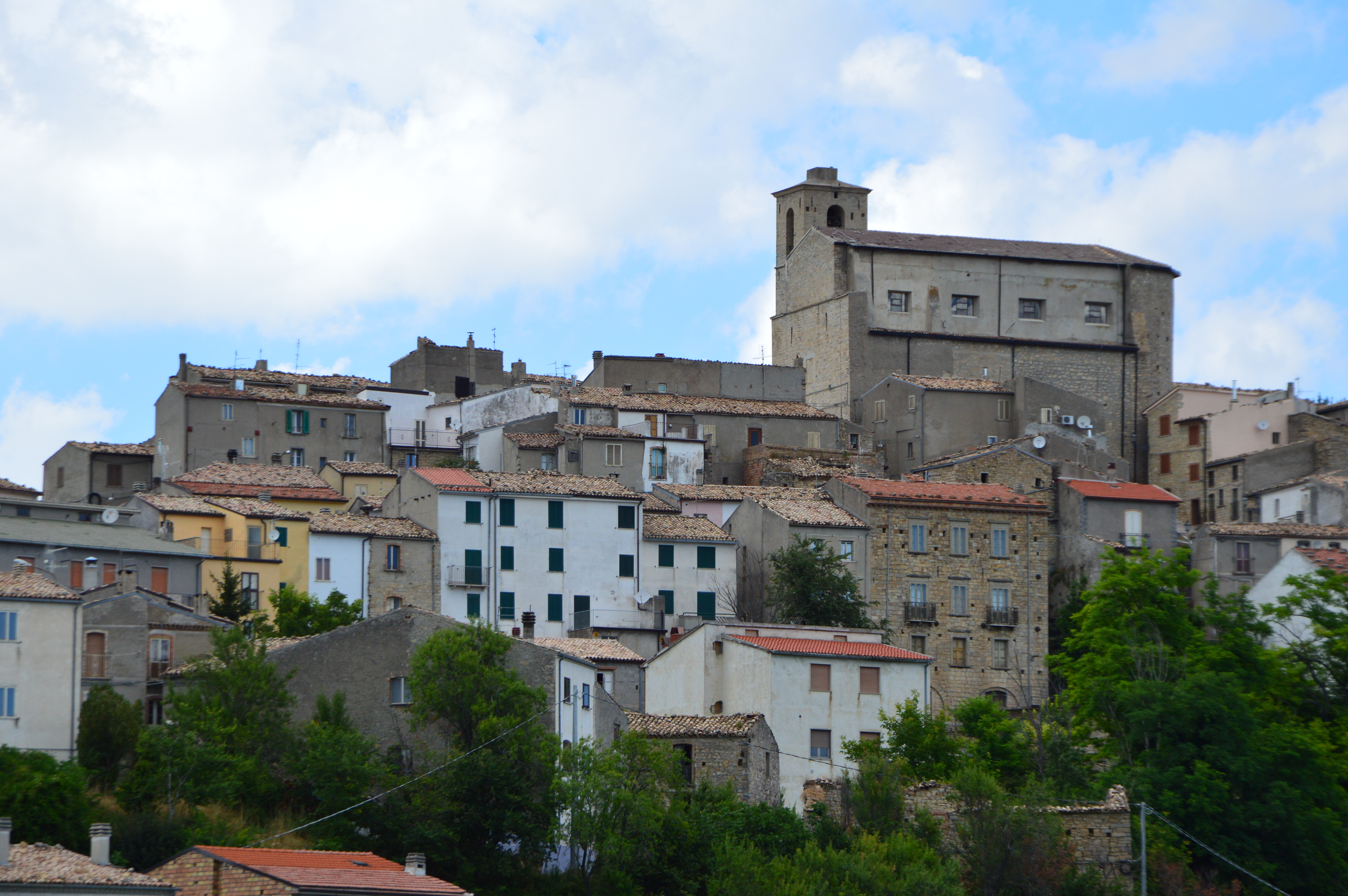

Fraine (Abruzzese: Fraìune) is a comune and town in the province of Chieti, Abruzzo, southern Italy.
