= Montebello sul Sangro =

- Comune
- Comune di Montebello sul Sangro
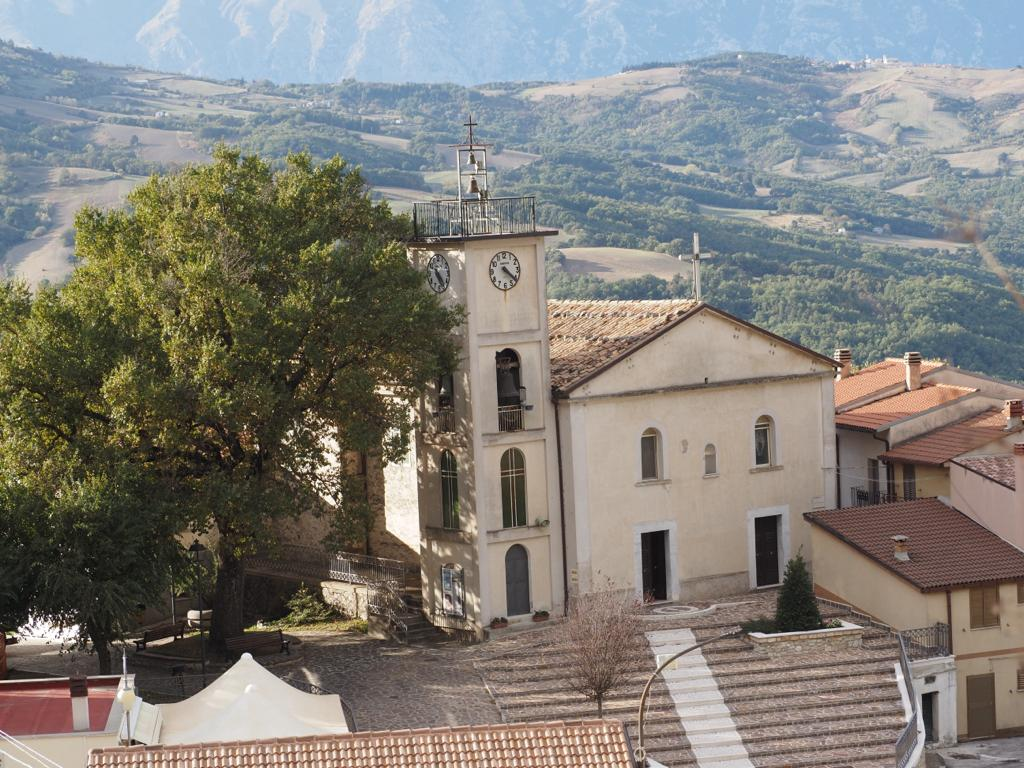
- The church of santa giusta

- Location within Italy Location within Abruzzo
- Coordinates: 41°59′N 14°20′E
- Country: Italy
- Region: Abruzzo
- Province: Chieti (CH)
- Frazioni: Civitaluparella, Montelapiano, Pennadomo, Villa Santa Maria

Government
  - Mayor: Nicola Di fabrizio

Area
  - Total: 5 km^{2} (1.9 sq mi)
- Elevation: 810 m (2,660 ft)

Population (31 December 2022)
  - Total: 81
  - Density: 16/km^{2} (42/sq mi)
- Demonym: Montebellesi
- Time zone: UTC+1 (CET)
  - Summer (DST): UTC+2 (CEST)
- Postal code: 66040
- Dialing code: 0872
- ISTAT code: 069009
- Patron saint: San Ciriaco e San Giovanni Battista
- Saint day: 8 August, 28 August
- Website: Official website

Montebello sul Sangro is a comune and town in the province of Chieti in the Abruzzo region of Italy.

== History ==
The town originated in the 12th century, and was originally known as “Malanotte” literally meaning “bad night”. Later on it was renamed “buonanotte” or good night in English. The town was ruled over by multiple feudal lords throughout its history.

There are two local legends on how the village got its original name. The first of which claims that the natives of the village lost a battle or war and they had to give up their wives to the winners for one night as a consequence of losing. Therefore, the natives named it “malanotte” because it was a bad night for them and the winners called it “buonanotte” because it was a good night for them.

The second story claims a king was going to the town on a night where there was a snowstorm and a blizzard. Supposedly he came across the castle he named it “castello di malanotte” Due to the bad weather. The King apparently later returned during a good summer's night and said “this is a good night” And that was supposedly why it was called “buonanotte”. The name Buonanotte was kept Up until 1969 when the natives of the town decided to change it to Montebello sul sangro, the reasoning for this was when the natives of the town said they were from buonanotte other people laughed at the name.

In 2020, an art installation called Buonanotte contemporanea was added.
