= Province of Chieti =

Province of Chieti Provincia di Chieti (Italian) Pruvìngie de Chjìte (Neapolitan)
- Province
- Palazzo del Governo, the provincial seat

- Flag Seal

- Location of the province of Chieti in Italy
- Coordinates: 42°21′N 14°10′E
- Country: Italy
- Region: Abruzzo
- Capital(s): Chieti
- Municipalities: 104

Government
  - President: Francesco Menna (PD)

Area
  - Total: 2,599.58 km^{2} (1,003.70 sq mi)

Population (2026)
  - Total: 369,059
  - Density: 141.969/km^{2} (367.697/sq mi)

GDP
  - Total: €9.551 billion (2015)
  - Per capita: €24,374 (2015)
- Time zone: UTC+1 (CET)
  - Summer (DST): UTC+2 (CEST)
- Postal code: 66010-66012, 66014-66023, 66026, 66030-66034, 66036-66038, 66040-66043, 66045-66047, 66050-66052, 66054
- Telephone prefix: 085, 0871, 0872, 0873
- Vehicle registration: CH
- ISTAT code: 069

The Province of Chieti (Italian: provincia di Chieti; Abruzzese: pruvìngie de Chjìte) is a province in the region of Abruzzo in southern Italy. Its provincial capital is the homonymous city of Chieti. The province has a population of 369,059 in an area of 2,599.58 square kilometres (1,003.70 mi^{2}) across its 104 municipalities. Its provincial president is Francesco Menna.

Chieti's cathedral was first constructed during the 9th century but was reconstructed during the 13th century. The province contains the National Archaeology Museum of Abruzzo, in Italian the Museo Archeologico Nazionale d'Abruzzo, which contains items from the area prior to Roman rule.

== History ==
It was first settled by the Osci people near the Pescara River. In around 1000 BCE it was conquered by Marsi and Marrucini people. The city was also lived in by the Greeks, who named it Teate. It was conquered by the Romans in 305 BCE but after the fall of Rome in 476 CE, Theodoric the Great gained ownership of the city and it was subsequently used as a Lombard fortress. The city was then owned by the Franks, the Normans, the Hohenstaufen, the Angevins and Aragonese rulers until strong control over the city was gained by Charles V of France. Chieti was made the capital of Abruzzo Citra under its period of rule by the House of Bourbon.

The province of Chieti contains Ortona, a town founded by Fretani people for trading with the Greeks, which was the scene of a World War II battle between German and predominantly British and Canadian forces; over 2,000 civilians died and the town was largely destroyed.

== Geography ==
The province of Chieti is one of four provinces in the region of Abruzzo, on the eastern coast of Italy. It is the most easternmost province in the region and is bounded to the northeast by the Adriatic Sea. The province of Pescara lies to the north and the province of L'Aquila to the northwest. To the south lies the province of Isernia and the province of Campobasso lies to the south east, both these provinces being part of the region of Molise. The provincial capital is Chieti, situated on a ridge a few miles inland and just south of the River Aterno-Pescara, which flows into the sea at nearby Pescara.

There has been a movement by farmers away from the land and the area. The outflow has been greatest from the hilly and mountainous areas, where the holdings are small and worked by the families who own them. In the period 1951 to 1971, the number of people employed in agriculture in Chieti fell from over 80% to around 45%, the number employed in industry tripled to around 20% and the number employed in the service sector, tripled to around 30%.

=== Municipalities ===
The province has 104 municipalities:

- Altino
- Archi
- Ari
- Arielli
- Atessa
- Bomba
- Borrello
- Bucchianico
- Canosa Sannita
- Carpineto Sinello
- Carunchio
- Casacanditella
- Casalanguida
- Casalbordino
- Casalincontrada
- Casoli
- Castel Frentano
- Castelguidone
- Castiglione Messer Marino
- Celenza sul Trigno
- Chieti
- Civitaluparella
- Civitella Messer Raimondo
- Colledimacine
- Colledimezzo
- Crecchio
- Cupello
- Dogliola
- Fallo
- Fara Filiorum Petri
- Fara San Martino
- Filetto
- Fossacesia
- Fraine
- Francavilla al Mare
- Fresagrandinaria
- Frisa
- Furci
- Gamberale
- Gessopalena
- Gissi
- Giuliano Teatino
- Guardiagrele
- Guilmi
- Lama dei Peligni
- Lanciano
- Lentella
- Lettopalena
- Liscia
- Miglianico
- Montazzoli
- Montebello sul Sangro
- Monteferrante
- Montelapiano
- Montenerodomo
- Monteodorisio
- Mozzagrogna
- Orsogna
- Ortona
- Paglieta
- Palena
- Palmoli
- Palombaro
- Pennadomo
- Pennapiedimonte
- Perano
- Pietraferrazzana
- Pizzoferrato
- Poggiofiorito
- Pollutri
- Pretoro
- Quadri
- Rapino
- Ripa Teatina
- Rocca San Giovanni
- Roccamontepiano
- Roccascalegna
- Roccaspinalveti
- Roio del Sangro
- Rosello
- San Buono
- San Giovanni Lipioni
- San Giovanni Teatino
- San Martino sulla Marrucina
- San Salvo
- San Vito Chietino
- Sant'Eusanio del Sangro
- Santa Maria Imbaro
- Scerni
- Schiavi di Abruzzo
- Taranta Peligna
- Tollo
- Torino di Sangro
- Tornareccio
- Torrebruna
- Torrevecchia Teatina
- Torricella Peligna
- Treglio
- Tufillo
- Vacri
- Vasto
- Villa Santa Maria
- Villalfonsina
- Villamagna

== Demographics ==
Historical population
Year	Pop.	±%
1861	297,246	—
1871	310,664	+4.5%
1881	316,496	+1.9%
1901	343,782	+8.6%
1911	352,844	+2.6%
1921	360,890	+2.3%
1931	368,780	+2.2%
1936	374,727	+1.6%
1951	400,210	+6.8%
1961	373,632	−6.6%
1971	351,567	−5.9%
1981	370,534	+5.4%
1991	381,830	+3.0%
2001	382,076	+0.1%
2011	387,956	+1.5%
2021	373,717	−3.7%
Source: ISTAT

As of 2026, the population is 369,059, of which 49.1% are male, and 50.9% are female. Minors make up 13.7% of the population, and seniors make up 27.3%.

=== Immigration ===
As of 2025, immigrants make up 10.4% of the population. The 5 largest foreign countries of birth are Romania, Albania, Switzerland, Germany, and Argentina.

=== Quality of life ===
Quality of life indicators according to Il Sole 24 Ore in 2019
Indicators	Values
Wealth and consumption
Value added per inhabitant	€23,300
Per capita bank deposits	€19,777.2
Average monthly mortgage payments	€709.8
Average remaining financial exposure	€28,029.0
Average price of new 100 m^{2} apartments in semicentral zones of the capital	€1150.0 per m^{2}
Average monthly rental fee of new 100 m^{2} apartments in semicentral zones of the capital	€350.0
Sold m^{2}/offered m^{2}	65.0%
Average old-age pension amount	€981.3
Annual family expenditure on durable goods	€2191.0
Per capita protests	€9.7
Percentage of over 18 population with active credits	38.3%
Average income per taxpayer	€17,432
Income per taxpayer variation from 2007 to 2017	1.4%
Environment and services
Average per capita local governments social expenditure for disabled people, senior citizens, and minors	€59.0
Percentage of residents dismissed from hospitals out of Region	15.0%
Air pollution in terms of PM_{10}	24.0 μg/m³
Family doctors/1,000 inhabitants	1.1
Pediatricians/1,000 inhabitants aged from 0 to 15 years old	2.7
Justice and safety
Reported car thefts/100,000 inhabitants	109.4
Reported home burglaries/100,000 inhabitants	190.1
Reported rapes/100,000 inhabitants	2.9
Reported crimes/100,000 inhabitants	2679.0
Reported robberies/100,000 inhabitants	20.2
Reported extortions/100,000 inhabitants	11.4
Reported crimes associated with psychoactive drugs/100,000 inhabitants	38.4
Reported frauds and informatics frauds/100,000 inhabitants	265.1
Civil procedures/100,000 inhabitants	2530.4
Percentage of cases pending more than three years	0.1%
Average duration of civil procedures	244.4 days
Defined procedures/new ones	1.0
Reports of crimes associated with money laundering/100,000 inhabitants	0.5
Reported fires/100,000 inhabitants	7.8
Dead and injured people due to road accidents/1,000 inhabitants	3.9
Business and occupation
Regular immigrants/resident population	0.1%
Unemployment rate (from 15 to 74 years old)	11.3%
Youth unemployment rate (from 15 to 29 years old)	30.2%
Goods exported abroad/GDP	65.3%
Inactive resident population	34.9%
Registered companies/100 inhabitants	11.7
Innovative startups/1,000 capital companies	3.3
Difference between new registered companies and ceased companies/companies registered in the former year	0.1
Failing companies/companies registered	1.4%
Demography and society
Domestic net migration	-0.6%
Mortality rate per 10,000 inhabitants	11.8
Deaths due to heart attacks/1,000 inhabitants in five years	3.1
Deaths due to tumors/1,000 inhabitants in five years	13.5
Life expectancy at birth	82.9 years
Average number of people per family	2.3
Life expectancy at birth increase	2.1 years
Households and unions/1,000 inhabitants	497.3
Successful births/average resident population	6.6 ‰
Population aged 65 and over/population aged 15–64	0.391
Population aged 65 and over/population aged 0–14	2.016
Difference between population that declares to become resident abroad and vice versa/1,000 inhabitants	3.1
Years of schooling received on average by over 25 population	10.4
Acquisition of citizenship/foreign residents	2.2%
Culture and free time
Cinema seats/100,000 inhabitants	1927.5
Libraries/10,000 inhabitants	3.2
Restaurants and bars/100,000 inhabitants	685.5
Shows/10 km^{2}	175.0
Book shops/100.000 inhabitants	7.0
Gyms/100.000 inhabitants	11.2
Per capita expenditure on shows	€9.8
Percentage of population subscriber of ultra-broadband	3.4%
Hotel beds/km^{2}	9.7

== Main sights ==
=== Chieti ===
The bell tower of the Cathedral of Chieti

- The Gothic Cathedral, re-built by bishop Attone I in 1069. Of that building only parts of the Romanesque crypt remain. The church was remade in the 14th century and the bell tower was enlarged. After several earthquakes, the church was rebuilt again in the late 17th-18th centuries in Baroque style.
- Oratory of Sacro Monte dei Morti
- Church of San Francesco al Corso, founded in 1239. The façade shows an incomplete Baroque restoration.
- Church of Santa Chiara
- Palazzo della Provincia e della Prefettura, which houses Valerico Laccetti's history painting Christus imperat

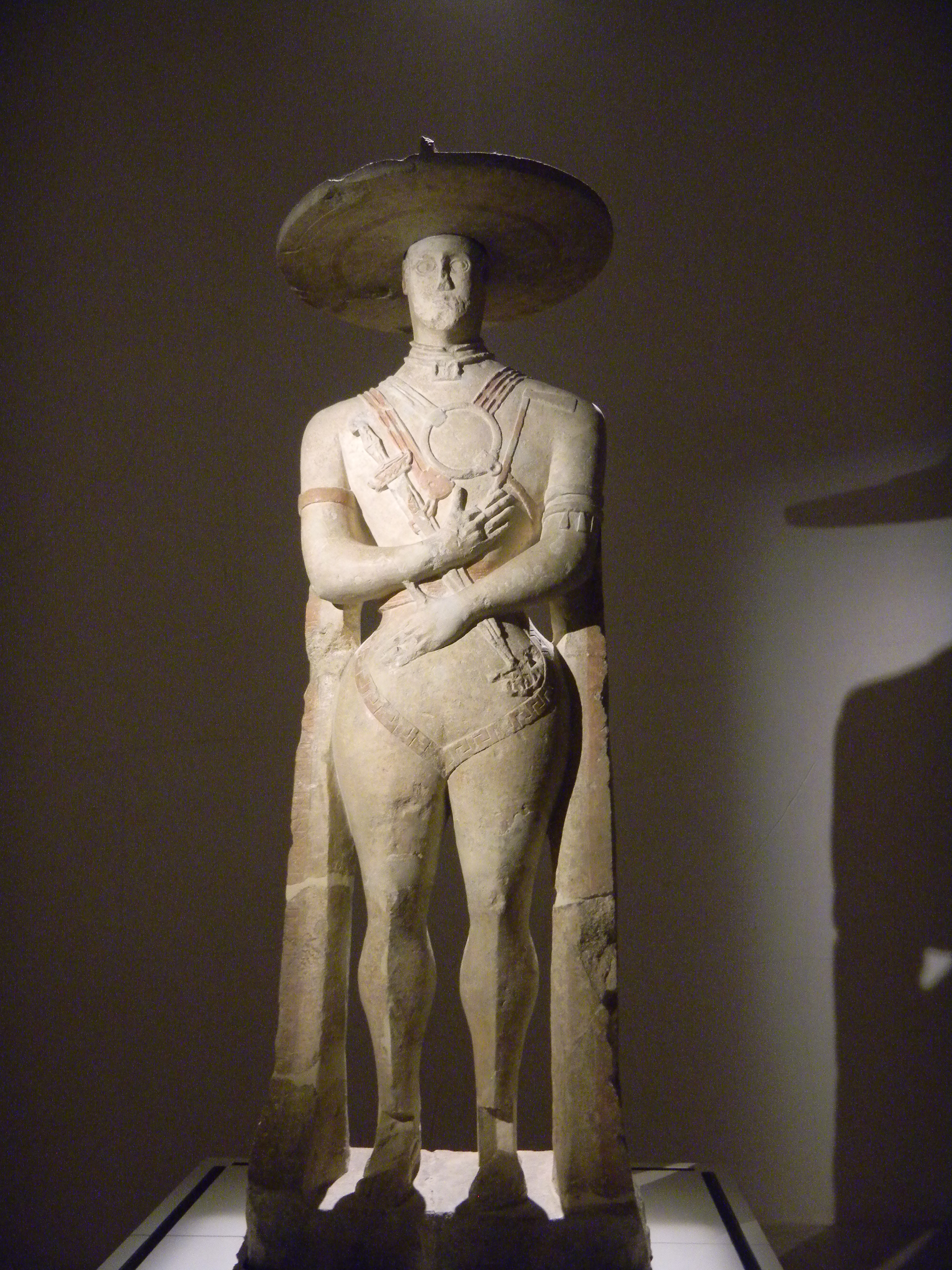
The famous Warrior of Capestrano in the National Archeological Museum of Abruzzo in Chieti

Under the church of SS. Pietro e Paolo and the adjoining houses are extensive substructures (in opus reticulatum and brickwork) of the 1st century CE, belonging to a building erected by M. Vectius Marcellus and Helvidia Priscilla. There are also remains of large reservoirs and of an ancient theatre. In the early 21st century, new archeological excavations are under way on the site of the former Campo Sportivo.

=== Lanciano ===
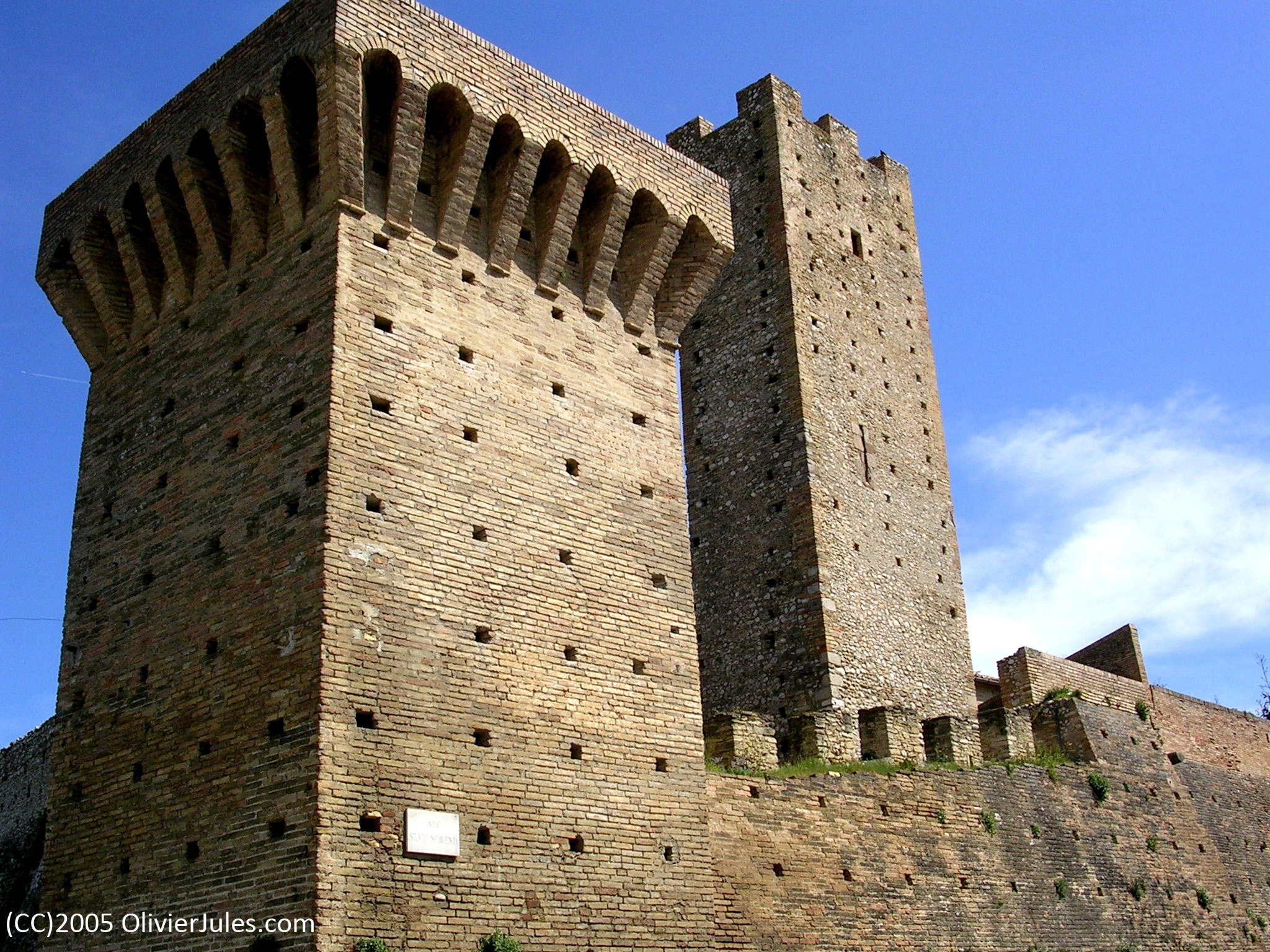
The Torri Montanare

- Cathedral of Santa Maria del Ponte ("St. Mary of the Bridge"), so called because it is built on bridgework along a precipice: is the work of Michitelli (1619) and has some paintings by Pozzulaniello (Giacinto Diana). It houses also an 8th-century Byzantine statue portraying the Madonna, probably brought here during the iconoclast controversy.
- Chiesa di Santa Maria Maggiore, one of the most important architectural sites in Abruzzo. Built in 1227 according to Bourgogne-Cistercian lines, it was updated in 1540 in Baroque style, with the addition of two aisles and stucco decorations (recently stripped off). The main gate is from 1317.
- Chiesa di San Francesco (1258), built over a pre-existing 7th-century church. The high altar houses the relics of the Eucharistic Miracle.
- Chiesa di Sant'Agostino (1270). The façade has maintained the original rose window and the gate, while the single nave interior is a Baroque restoration.
- Chiesa di San Biagio (11th century) is the oldest church of the city. It has a bell tower and it's always opened on 3 February for the anointing of the throat, a Catholic rite linked to the cult Saint Biagio.
- Torri Montanare, a relic of the ancient walls (11th century). They consist in two massive towers, the most recent dating to the 15th century, offering a panoramic view of the area.
- Porta San Biagio (11th century), the only one gate remaining of the nine once existing
- Torre civica (19th century) was built over a pre-existing tower next to the cathedral. Nowadays it is a belfry and a clock tower.
- Torre Aragonese (15th century) was a tower along the ancient walls.
- Palazzo dell'Arcivescovado (16th century) is still the seat of the archbishop and houses a diocesan Museum.
- Botteghe medievali was a house built in 1434. It has two floors and on the ground floor there are antique shops, with external bank according to the Roman use.

=== Vasto ===
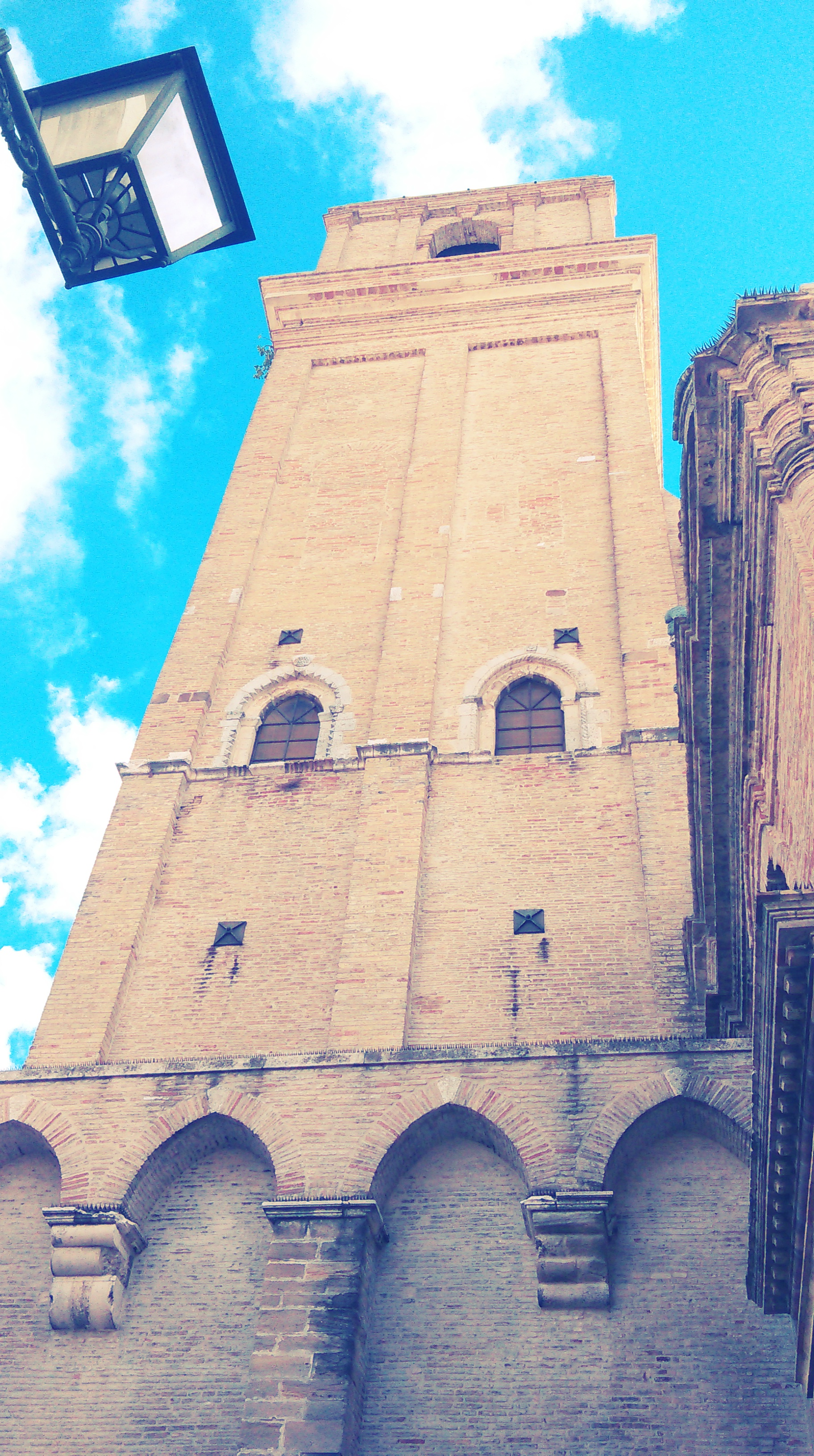
Santa Maria Maggiore church bell tower

The old part of the town (centro storico) features a number of interesting buildings and churches dating from the 12th to the 18th century, including:

- Cathedral of San Giuseppe
- Santa Maria Maggiore: largest and oldest church in the town, mentioned in a document as early as 1195, with a tall bell tower. Damaged by the Turks in 1566, and by a fire in 1645, it went a thorough restructuring in 1735 in which it got the current shape. It hosts one of alleged Jesus' crown of thorns (Sacra Spina).
- Castello Caldoresco
- D'Avalos Palace, which houses four museums, called Musei di Palazzo d'Avalos

Below the hill on which the town is located, the beach resort town of Marina di Vasto offers a large sandy beach and several hotels and other facilities.

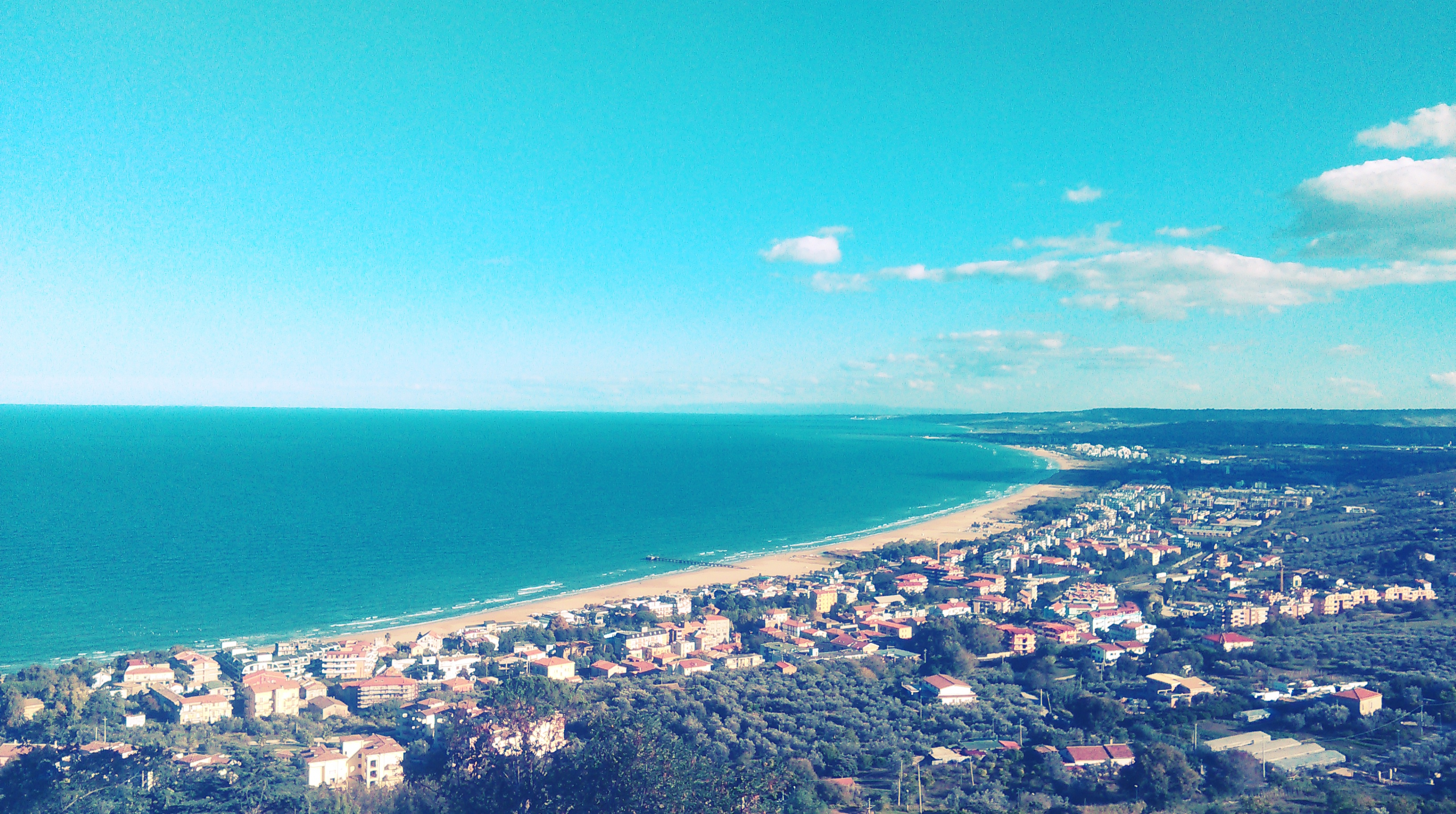
Marina di Vasto and the Golfo di Vasto in the Adriatic Sea, viewed from Vasto

Further north the coast becomes rocky and features interesting pebble and stone beaches and coves, as well as the typical trabocchi, that are typical wooden fishing machines of the Southern Abruzzo coast.
Amongst the most interesting natural areas, also featuring a number of sandy and rocky beaches, is the protected natural area of the Riserva Naturale di Punta Aderci, whose beaches were voted in 2014 3rd of the top 20 beaches in Italy.

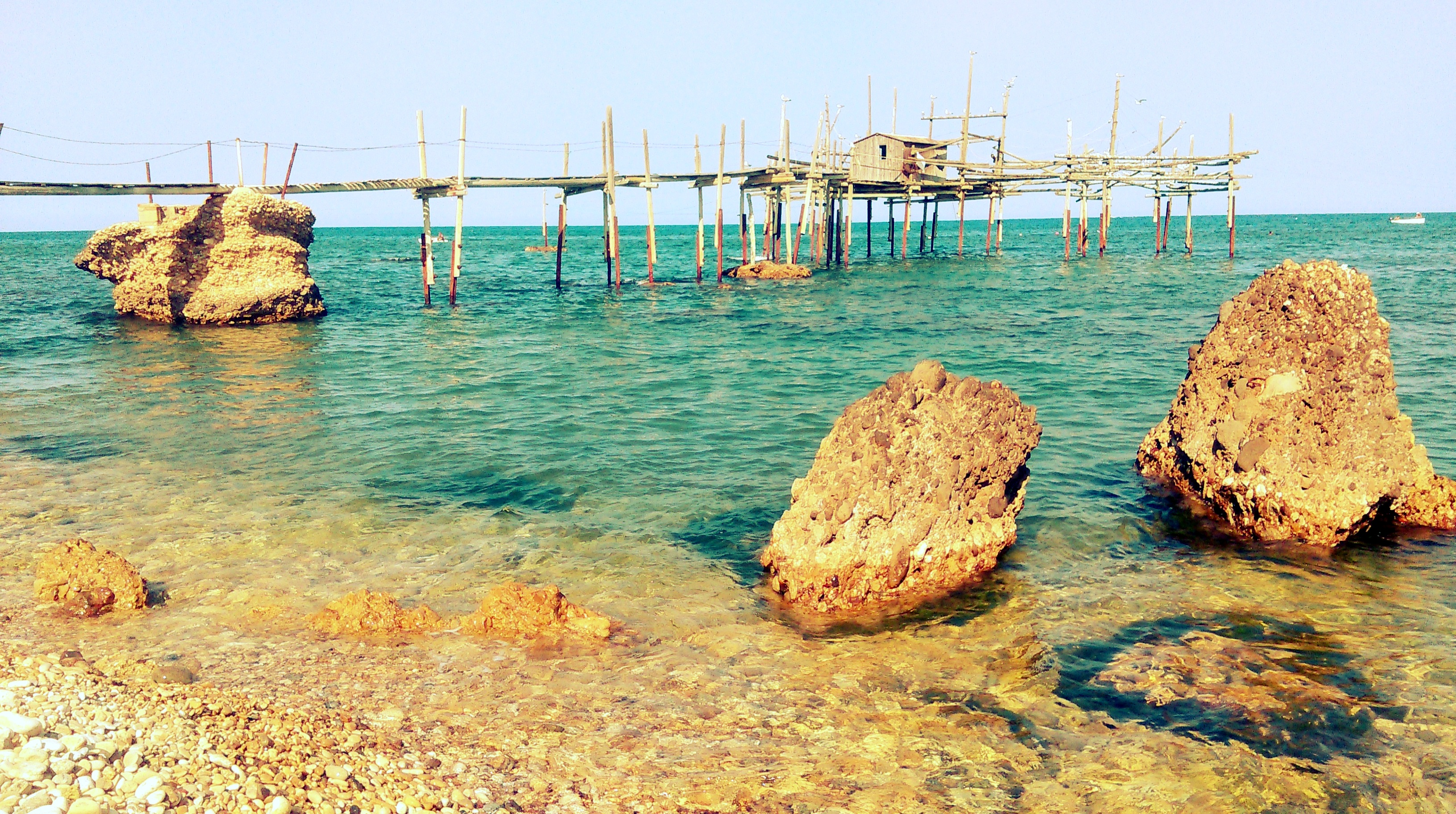
Trabocco

=== Ortona ===
The origins of Ortona are uncertain. Presumably, it was first inhabited by the Frentani, an Italic population. In 2005, during works near the Castle, a Bronze Age settlement was discovered, and the Roman town largely coincided with this first settlement. Some sections of paved roads and urban walls, as well as some archaeological findings are the only remains of this period. Ortona remained a part of the Roman Empire i.e., the Byzantine Empire for several centuries, before it was annexed by the Kingdom of the Lombards. In 803 the Franks incorporated Ortona into the county of Chieti. From that date on, the town remained tied to Chieti and its territory.

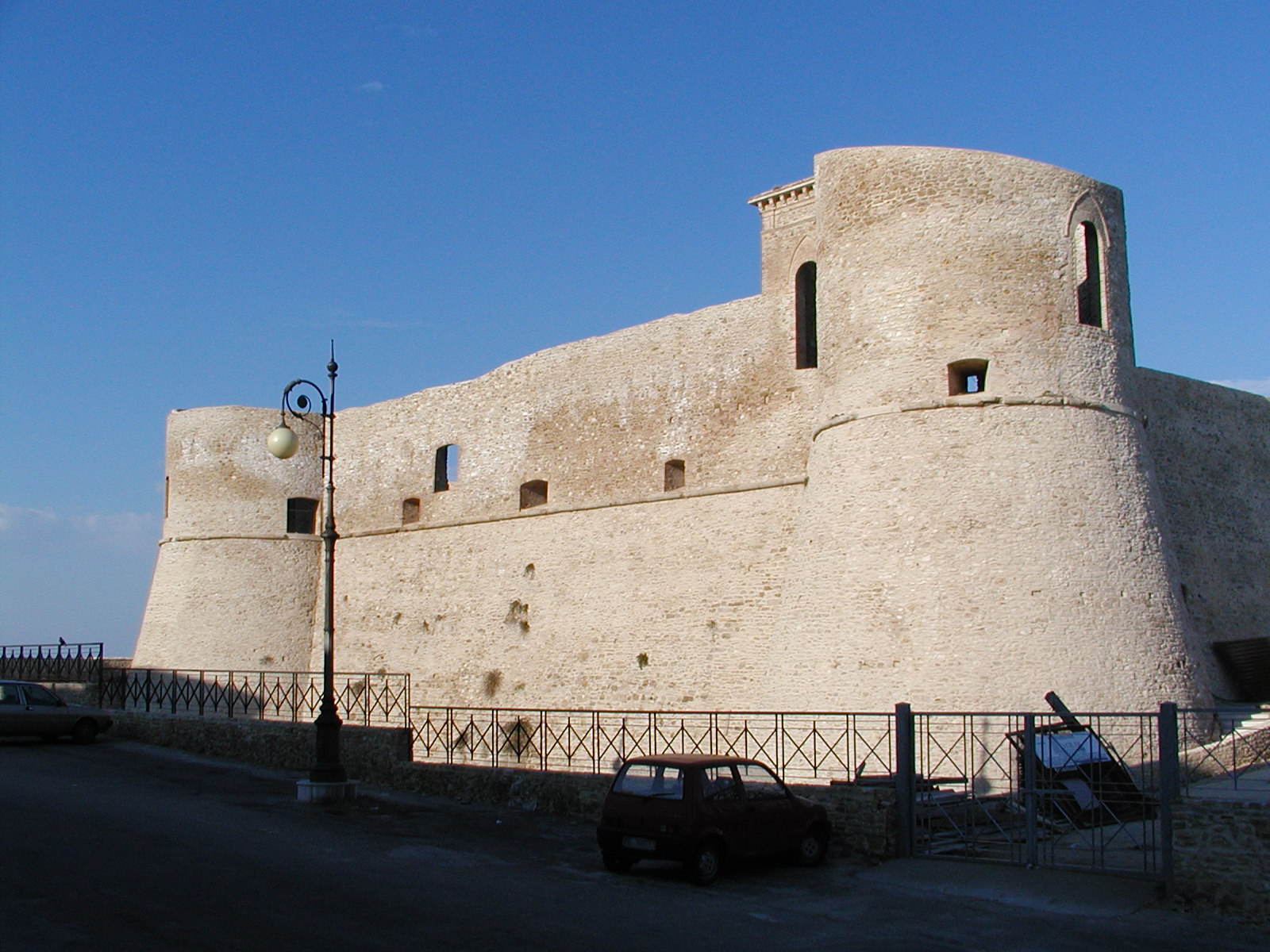
The Aragonese castle in Ortona

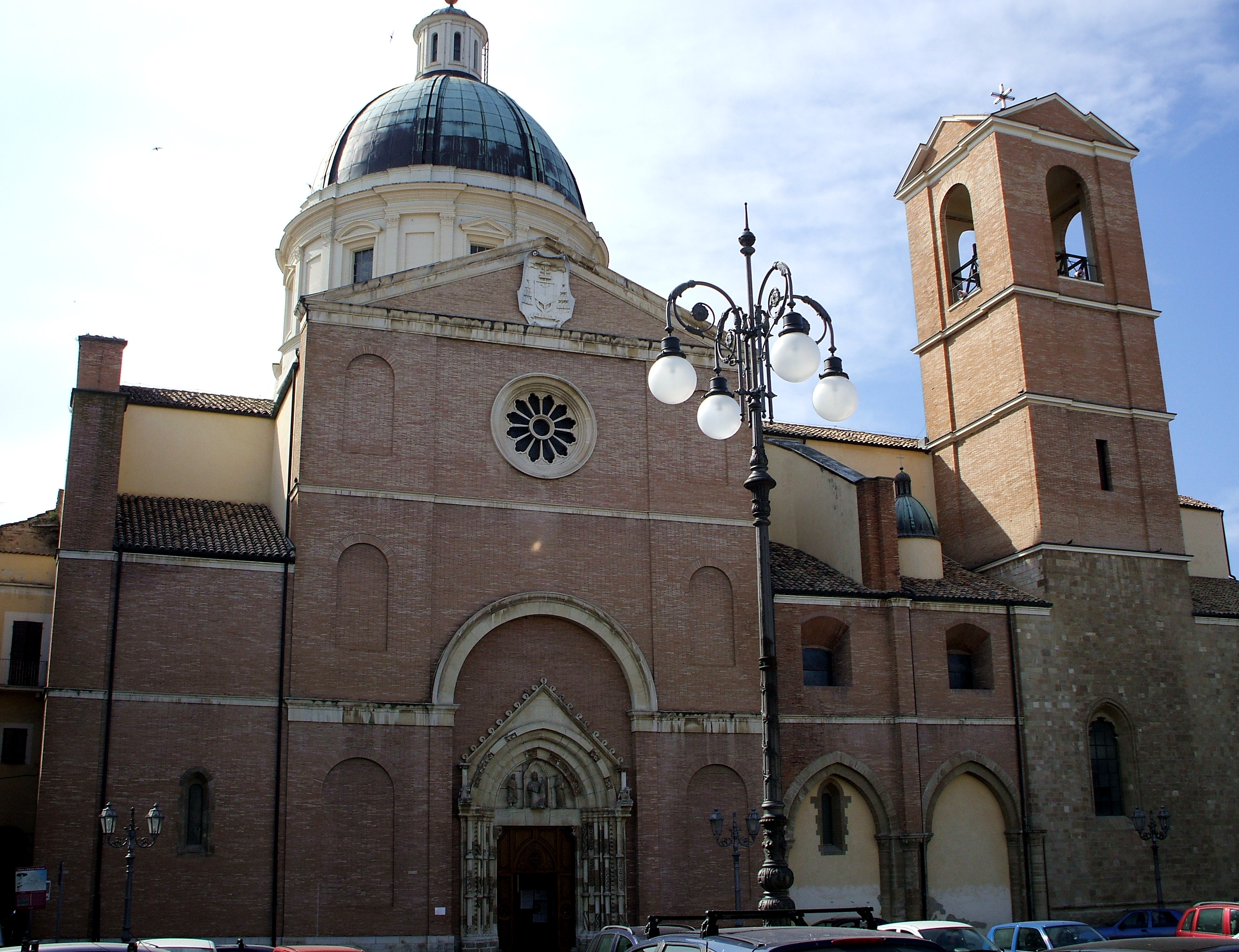
The Basilica of San Tommaso Apostolo, Ortona, where are the remains of the saint

In 1258 the relics of the Apostle Thomas were brought to Ortona by the sailor Leone Acciaiuoli. In the first half of the 15th century, its walls were built, and during this period Ortona fought with the nearby town of Lanciano in a fierce war that ended in 1427. On June 30, 1447, ships from Venice destroyed the port of Ortona; consequently the king of Sicily at that time commissioned the construction of a Castle to dominate the renovated port. In 1582 the town was acquired by Margaret of Parma, daughter of Emperor Charles V and Duchess of Parma. In 1584 Margaret decided to build a great mansion, known as Palazzo Farnese, which was never completed due to her death.

After the establishment of the Kingdom of Italy in 1860, Ortona became one of the first sea resorts on the Adriatic Sea. On 9 September 1943, the royal family of the House of Savoy left German-occupied Italy from the port of Ortona. The defensive Gustav Line was established by the Germans at Ortona, extending towards Cassino on the opposite side of Italy. Ortona offered the Allies a supply port on the Adriatic and was fiercely defended by the Germans attracted the attention of that the international press in the struggle between the German paratroopers and the 2nd Canadian Infantry Brigade. This led to this battle being known as "Little Stalingrad".

=== Guardiagrele ===
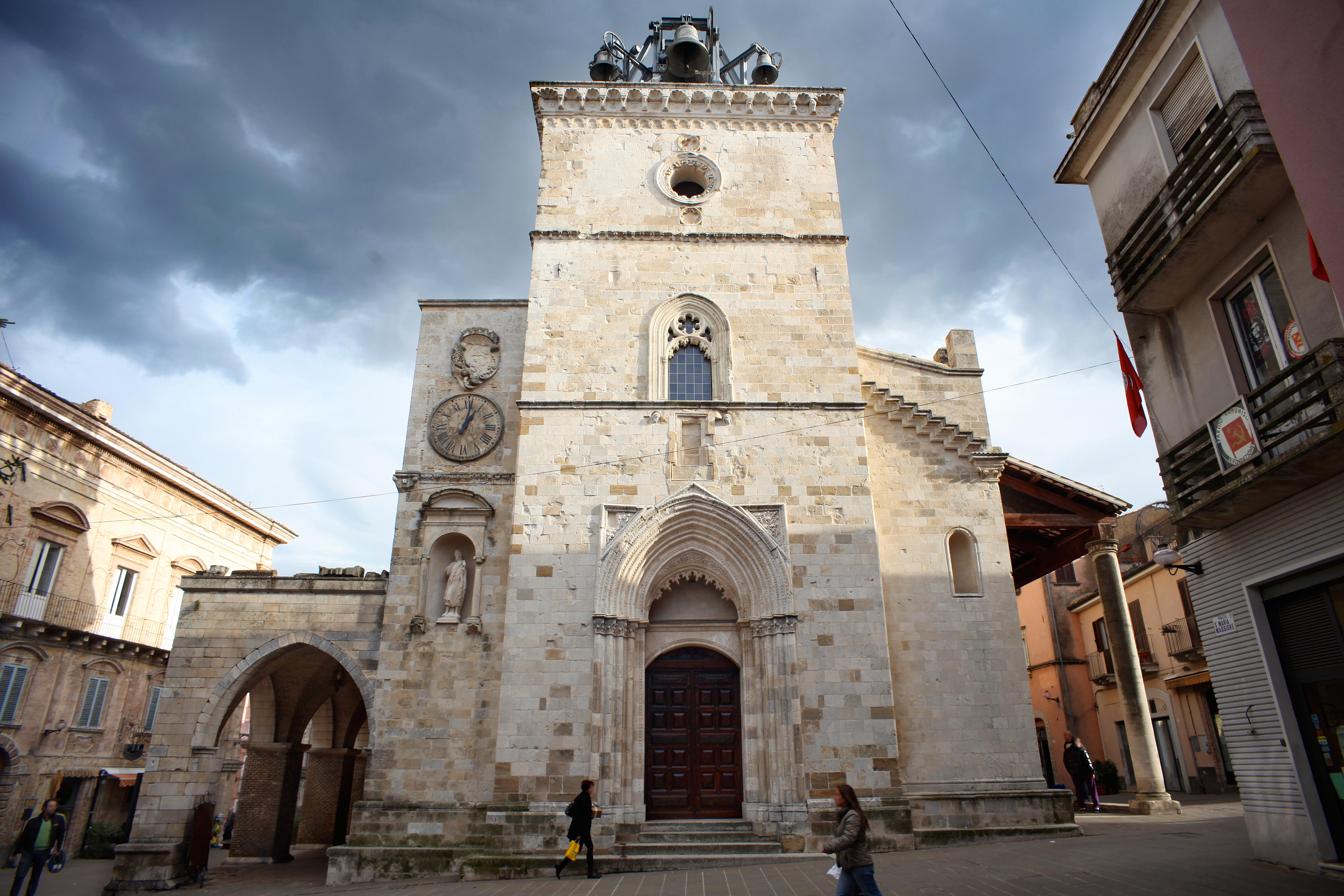
West view of Santa Maria Maggiore

The biggest church in Guardiagrele is Santa Maria Maggiore of which it has been written:

The façade presents a splendid 14th-century gothic portal, among the most elegant in the Abruzzi Gothic style. The Coronation of the Virgin sculpture group in the portal lunette is also magnificent, attributed to the school of Nicola di Guardiagrele. Under the colonnaded portico, next to the lateral door, is the splendid fresco by Andrea De Litio (1473) portraying Saint Christopher. In the interior, completely rebuilt in the 18th century following an earthquake, crumbling stucco-work in the Baroque style and a shrine of the same period set off a 15th-century fresco representing the Madonna of the Milk.

In addition to Santa Maria Maggiore, there are several other churches and palazzi or mansions of various ages which are of architectural interest, including S. Nicola di Bari (founded in the 4th century), the convent of the Chapuchins (1599), Palazzo De Lucia (16th century), Palazzo Elisii (15th-18th century), the cloister of the Palazzo Comunale Piazza San Francesco (17th century) and Palazzo Marini (1391).

Museums include:

- Museo Civico (Civic Museum)
- Museo del Costume e della Tradizione della Nostra Gente (Costume and Folk Museum)
- Museo del Duomo ("Cathedral Museum"), in Santa Maria Maggiore
- Museo Archeologico ("Archaeological Museum")

== International relations ==
=== Twin towns – sister cities ===
The province of Chieti is twinned with:

- Malmö Municipality, Skåne, Sweden

== See also ==
- Monte Castelfraiano
