= Pianibbie =

Coordinates: 42°08′51″N 14°18′58″E

- Frazione
- Interactive map of Pianibbie
- Country: Italy
- Region: Abruzzo
- Province: Chieti
- Time zone: UTC+1 (CET)
  - Summer (DST): UTC+2 (CEST)

Pianibbie is a frazione in the Province of Chieti in the Abruzzo region of Italy. The local parish church, Chiesa di Santa Maria Ausiliatrice (church of St. Mary, Helper of Christians), was built in 1929-1930 with a mix of Modernist and decorative touches.
