= Montefalcone nel Sannio =

- Comune
- Comune di Montefalcone nel Sannio
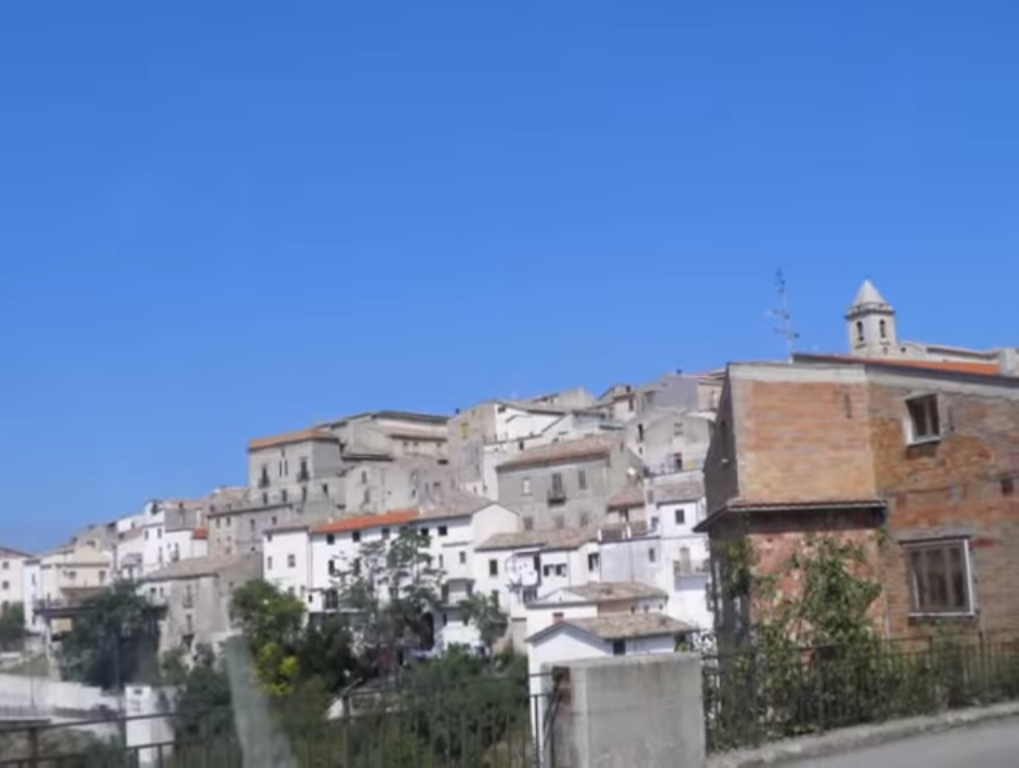
- Panorama of Montefalcone nel Sannio

- Location within Italy Location within Molise
- Coordinates: 41°52′N 14°38′E
- Country: Italy
- Region: Molise
- Province: Campobasso (CB)

Government
  - Mayor: Riccardo Vincifori

Area
  - Total: 32.57 km^{2} (12.58 sq mi)
- Elevation: 659 m (2,162 ft)

Population (30 November 2017)
  - Total: 1,512
  - Density: 46.42/km^{2} (120.2/sq mi)
- Demonym: Montefalconesi
- Time zone: UTC+1 (CET)
  - Summer (DST): UTC+2 (CEST)
- Postal code: 86033
- Dialing code: 0874
- Website: Official website

Montefalcone nel Sannio is a comune (municipality) in the Province of Campobasso in the Italian region Molise, located about 35 kilometres (22 mi) north of Campobasso.

Montefalcone nel Sannio borders the following municipalities: Castelmauro, Celenza sul Trigno, Montemitro, Roccavivara, San Felice del Molise.
