= Colledimezzo =

- Comune
- Comune di Colledimezzo
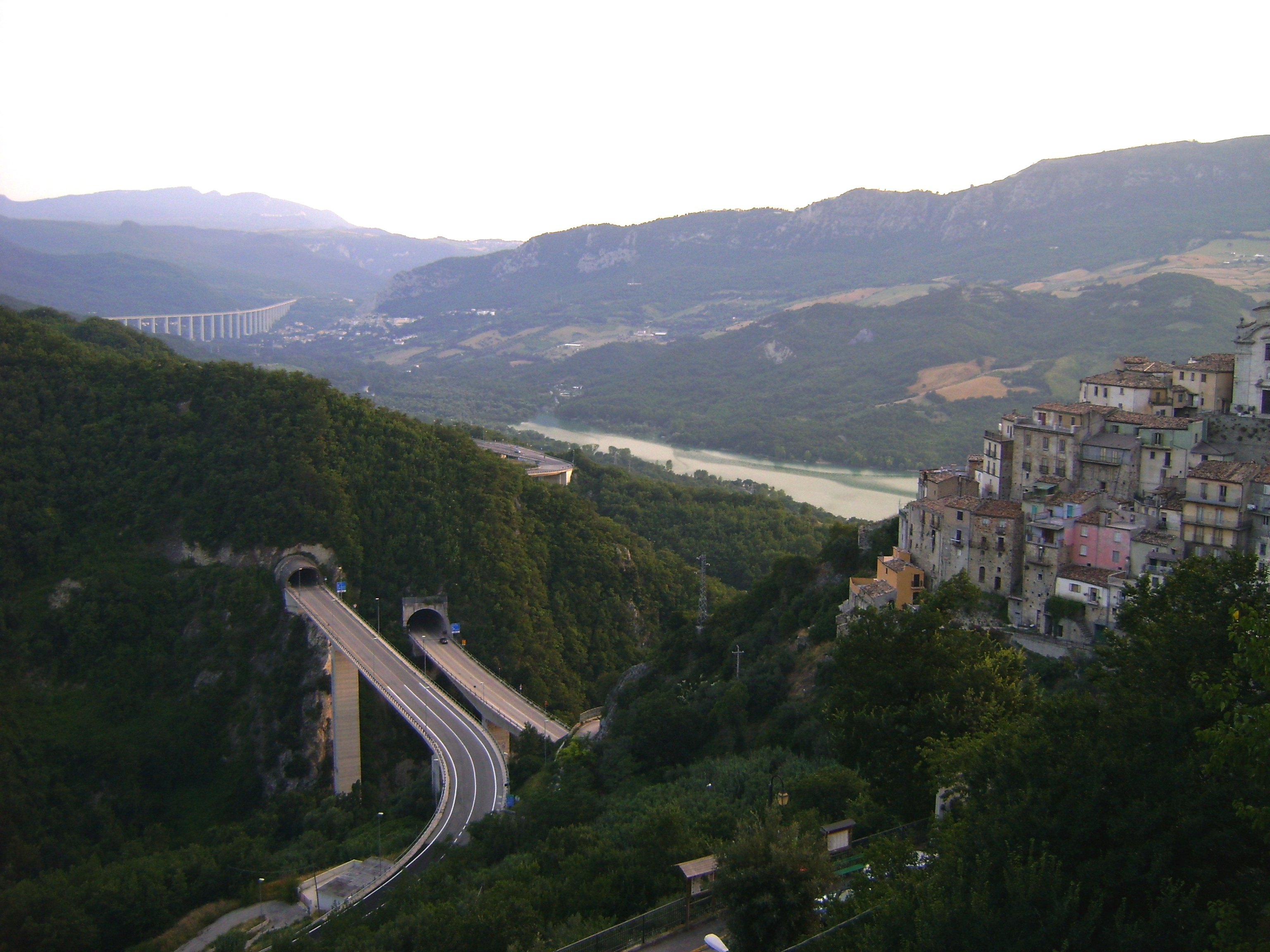
- Val di Sangro

- Location within Italy Location within Abruzzo
- Coordinates: 41°59′N 14°23′E
- Country: Italy
- Region: Abruzzo
- Province: Chieti (CH)
- Frazioni: Atessa, Montazzoli, Monteferrante, Pietraferrazzana, Villa Santa Maria

Area
  - Total: 11 km^{2} (4.2 sq mi)
- Elevation: 425 m (1,394 ft)

Population (1 January 2007)
  - Total: 555
  - Density: 50/km^{2} (130/sq mi)
- Demonym: Colledimezzesi
- Time zone: UTC+1 (CET)
  - Summer (DST): UTC+2 (CEST)
- Postal code: 66040
- Dialing code: 0872
- ISTAT code: 069026
- Patron saint: San Rocco
- Website: Official website

Colledimezzo (Abruzzese: Còlle) is a comune and town in the Province of Chieti in the Abruzzo region of Italy.
