= Sant'Eusanio =

Sant'Eusanio, Italian name of the Catholic Saint Eusanius, may refer to:

- Sant'Eusanio del Sangro, comune in the Province of Chieti, Abruzzo
- Sant'Eusanio Forconese, comune in the Province of L'Aquila, Abruzzo
- Sant'Eusanio, hamlet in the municipality of Monteroduni (Isernia), Molise
