= Civitaluparella =

- Comune
- Comune di Civitaluparella
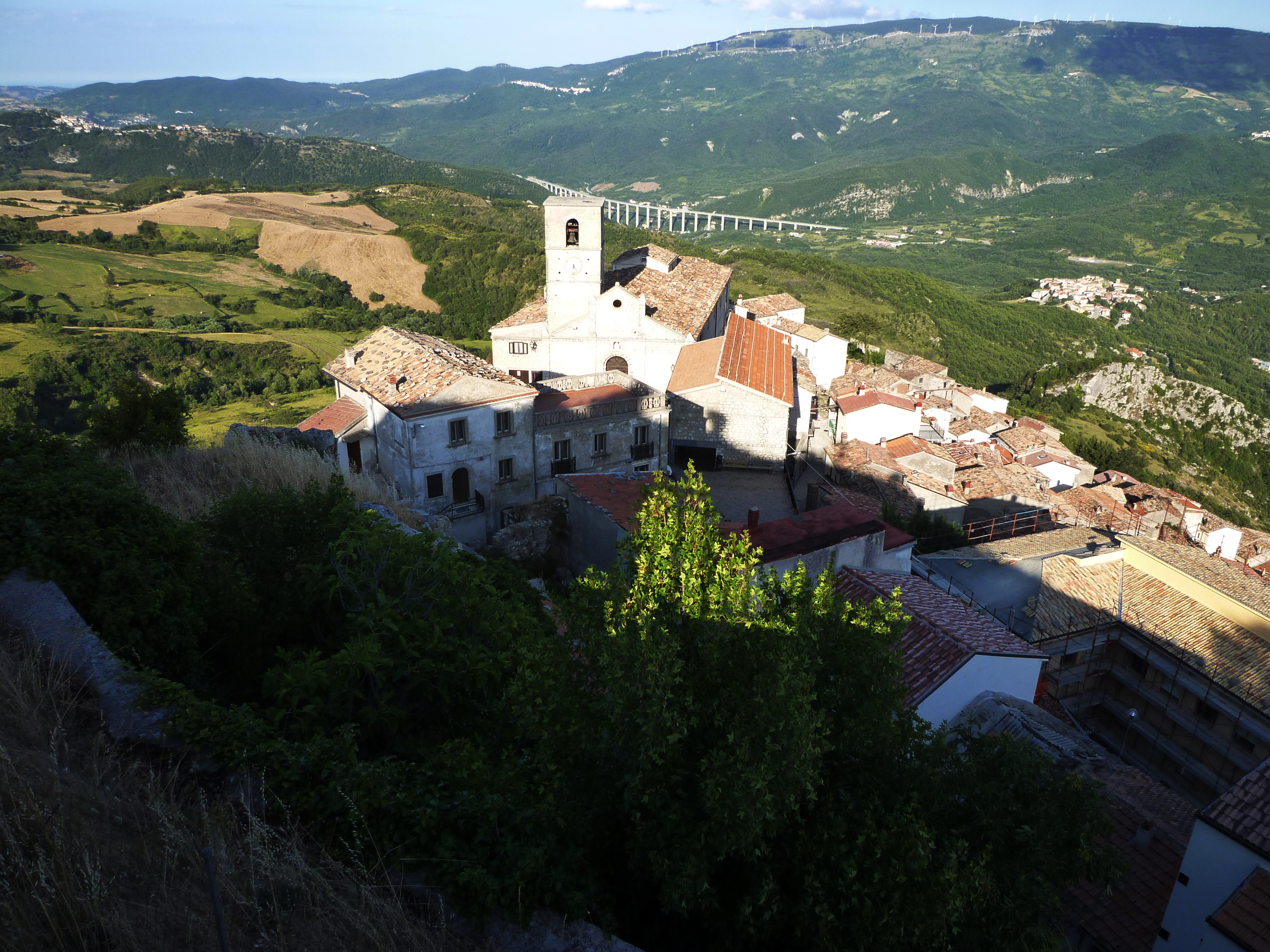
- Civitaluparella

- Location within Italy Location within Abruzzo
- Coordinates: 41°57′N 14°18′E
- Country: Italy
- Region: Abruzzo
- Province: Chieti (CH)
- Frazioni: Borrello, Fallo, Montebello sul Sangro, Montelapiano, Montenerodomo, Pennadomo, Pizzoferrato, Quadri

Area
  - Total: 22 km^{2} (8.5 sq mi)
- Elevation: 903 m (2,963 ft)

Population (1 January 2007)
  - Total: 402
  - Density: 18/km^{2} (47/sq mi)
- Demonym: Civitaluparellesi
- Time zone: UTC+1 (CET)
  - Summer (DST): UTC+2 (CEST)
- Postal code: 66040
- Dialing code: 0872
- ISTAT code: 069023
- Saint day: 16 August
- Website: Official website

Civitaluparella (Abruzzese: La Civéte) is a comune and town in the Province of Chieti in the Abruzzo region of Italy

== See also ==
- Castello Caldora
