= Perano =

- Comune
- Comune di Perano
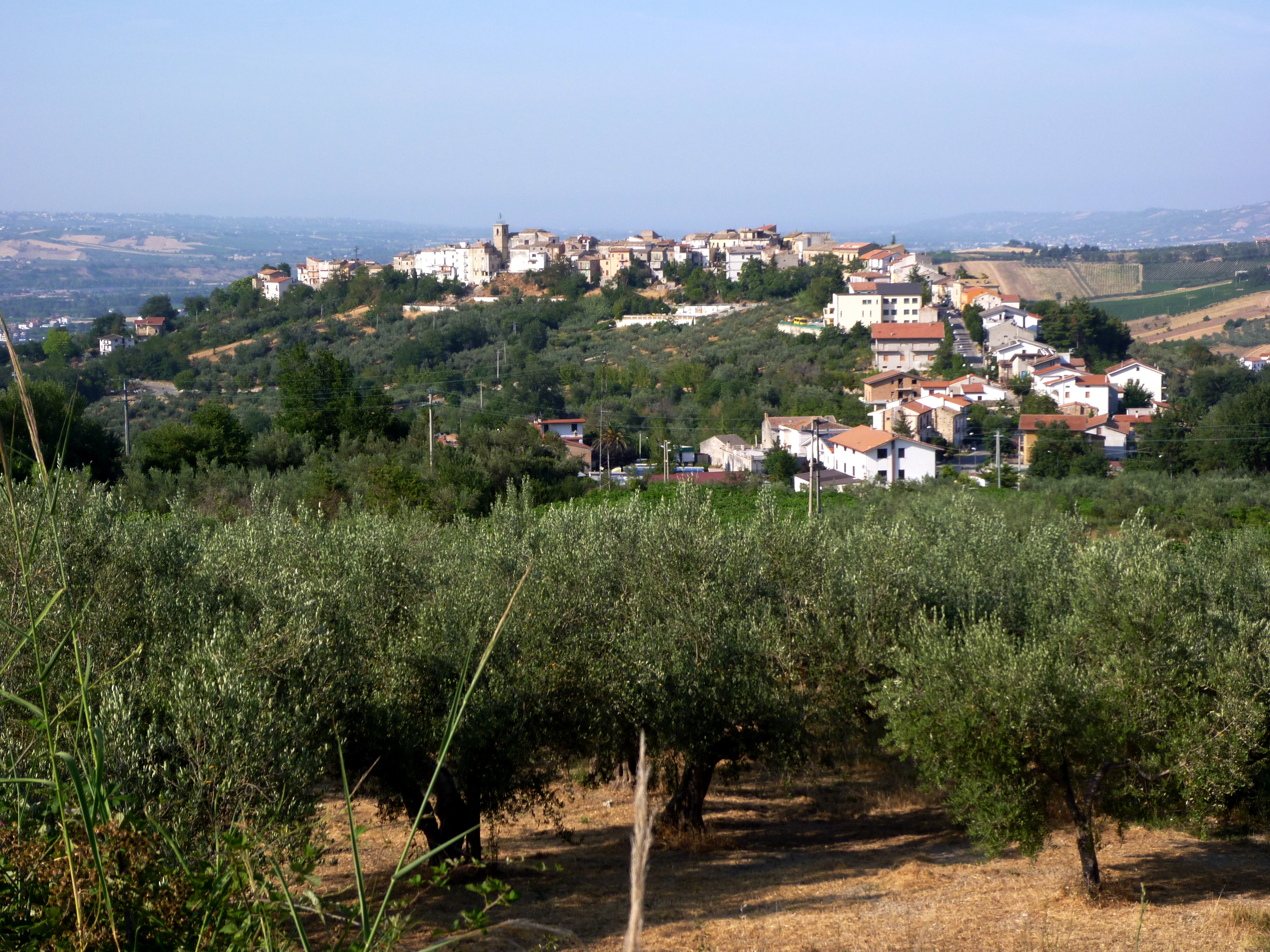
- View of Perano

- Location within Italy Location within Abruzzo
- Coordinates: 42°6′N 14°24′E
- Country: Italy
- Region: Abruzzo
- Province: Chieti (CH)
- Frazioni: Barbetti, Cerraiolo, Crocetta, Fontolfi, Impicciaturo, Maligni, Pugliesi, Quadroni, San Pastore, San Tommaso, Sciorilli, Tomassuoli, Tramozzini.

Area
  - Total: 6 km^{2} (2.3 sq mi)
- Elevation: 256 m (840 ft)

Population (2008)
  - Total: 1,675
  - Density: 280/km^{2} (720/sq mi)
- Demonym: Peranesi
- Time zone: UTC+1 (CET)
  - Summer (DST): UTC+2 (CEST)
- Postal code: 66040
- Dialing code: 0872
- ISTAT code: 069065
- Patron saint: San Filippo Neri
- Saint day: 26 May
- Website: Official website

Perano is a comune and town in the province of Chieti in the Abruzzo region of Italy.
