= Poggiofiorito =

- Comune
- Comune di Poggiofiorito
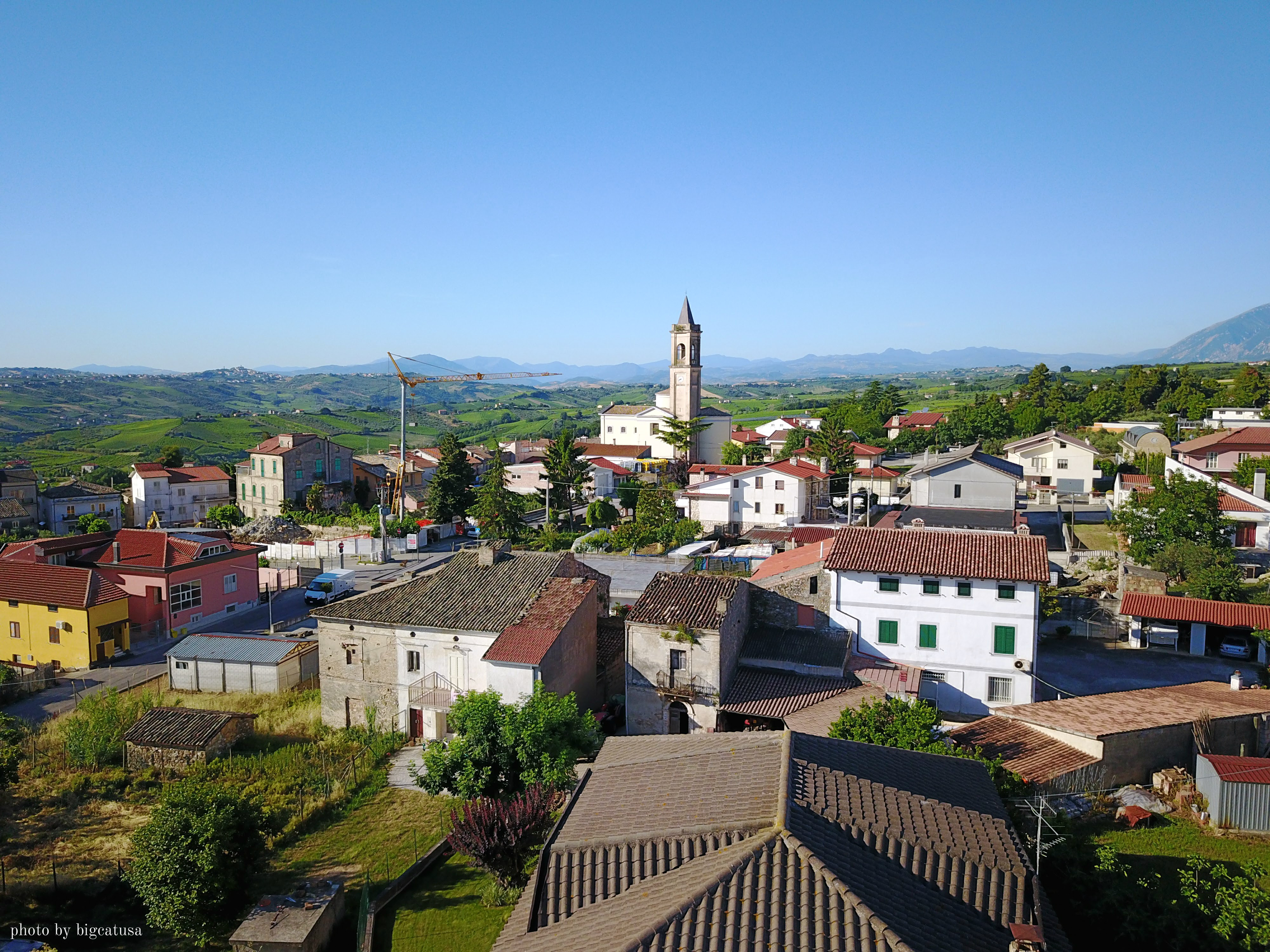

- Location within Italy Location within Abruzzo
- Coordinates: 42°15′N 14°19′E
- Country: Italy
- Region: Abruzzo
- Province: Chieti (CH)
- Frazioni: Chiusa, Martorella

Area
  - Total: 9 km^{2} (3.5 sq mi)
- Elevation: 299 m (981 ft)

Population (31 December 2007)
  - Total: 976
  - Density: 110/km^{2} (280/sq mi)
- Demonym: Poggiani
- Time zone: UTC+1 (CET)
  - Summer (DST): UTC+2 (CEST)
- Postal code: 66030
- Dialing code: 0871
- ISTAT code: 069067
- Patron saint: san Matteo
- Saint day: 21 September

Poggiofiorito is a comune and town in the Province of Chieti in the Abruzzo region of Italy
