= Giovanni Boccardi (astronomer) =

Giovanni Boccardi (20 June 1859, Castelmauro – 24 October 1936, Savona) was an Italian astronomer, mathematician, and priest.

As a priest of the Congregazione della Missione, Boccardi was an astronomer in the observatories of Collurania (1890), Catania (1900–1903) and Turin (1903–1923). At Turin he served as the director of the observatory and as a docent of astronomy in the local university. He also supervised the creation of the new site Pino Torinese of the Turin observatory (1912). In 1907 he founded the Rivista di astronomia e di scienze affini (Journal of Astronomy and Related Sciences).

Boccardi's work was mainly in astronomy. However, among his works, the "Guide du calculateur", published in 2 volumes in 1902 at Paris, is noteworthy as one of the first treatises on modern numerical analysis for computing machines.

Boccardi was an Invited Speaker of the ICM in 1900 at Paris, in 1908 at Rome, and in 1920 at Strasbourg. The asteroid 31015 Boccardi is named in his honor.
