= Roio del Sangro =

- Comune
- Comune di Roio del Sangro
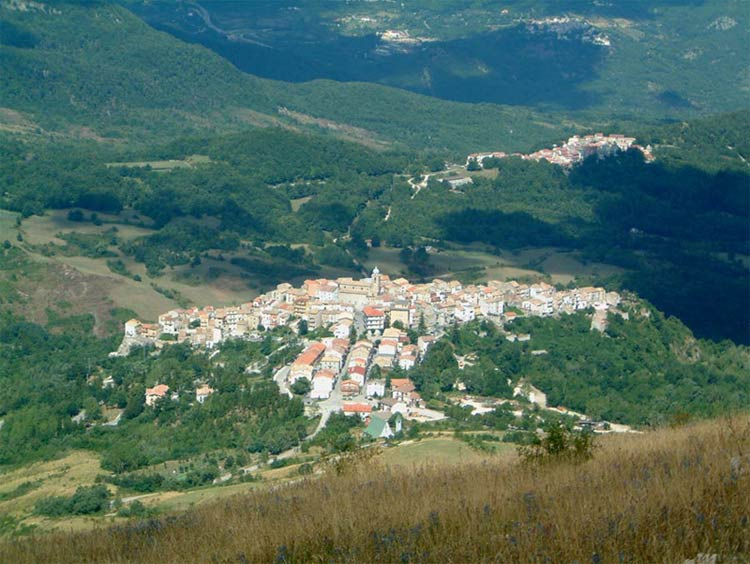

- Location within Italy Location within Abruzzo
- Coordinates: 41°55′N 14°22′E
- Country: Italy
- Region: Abruzzo
- Province: Chieti (CH)

Area
  - Total: 11 km^{2} (4.2 sq mi)
- Elevation: 840 m (2,760 ft)

Population (2004)
  - Total: 138
  - Density: 13/km^{2} (32/sq mi)
- Demonym: Roiesi
- Time zone: UTC+1 (CET)
  - Summer (DST): UTC+2 (CEST)
- Postal code: 66040
- Dialing code: 0872
- Patron saint: San Filippo Neri
- Saint day: 12 July

Roio del Sangro is a village and comune of the province of Chieti in the Abruzzo region of central Italy.
