= Villalfonsina =

- Comune
- Comune di Villalfonsina
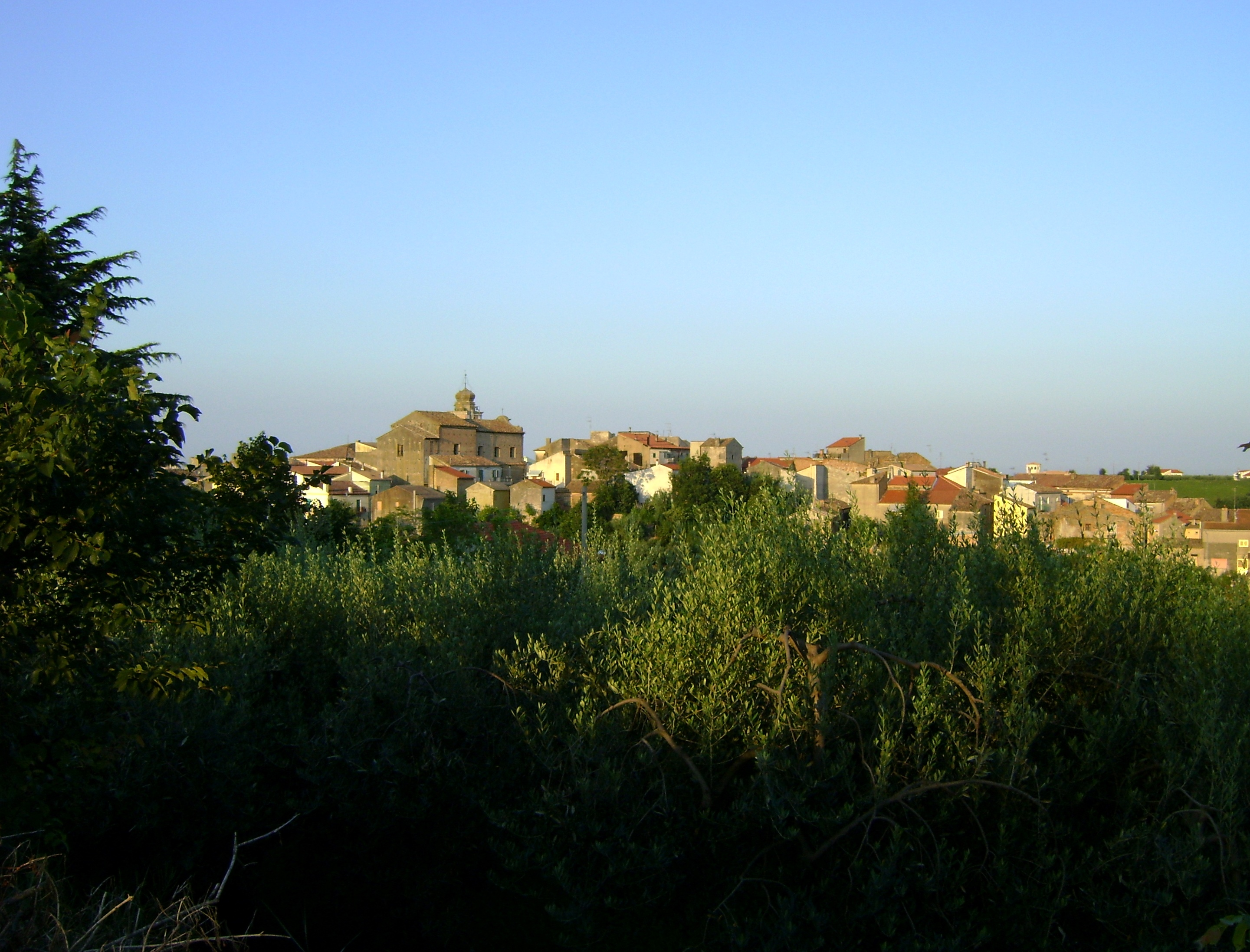

- Location within Italy Location within Abruzzo
- Coordinates: 42°10′N 14°34′E
- Country: Italy
- Region: Abruzzo
- Province: Chieti (CH)

Area
  - Total: 9 km^{2} (3.5 sq mi)
- Elevation: 203 m (666 ft)

Population (December 31, 2004)
  - Total: 1,038
  - Density: 120/km^{2} (300/sq mi)
- Time zone: UTC+1 (CET)
  - Summer (DST): UTC+2 (CEST)
- Postal code: 66020
- Dialing code: 0873
- Patron saint: St. Irene
- Website: Official website

Villalfonsina is a comune and town in the province of Chieti in the Abruzzo region of Italy. Named after a feudal lord, Alfonso d'Avalos, it is believed he founded the town and developed it into a successful centre of agriculture.

The town is located on the right bank of the Osento River and the inhabitants are called "Villesi".
