= Ari, Abruzzo =

Ari
- Comune
- Comune di Ari
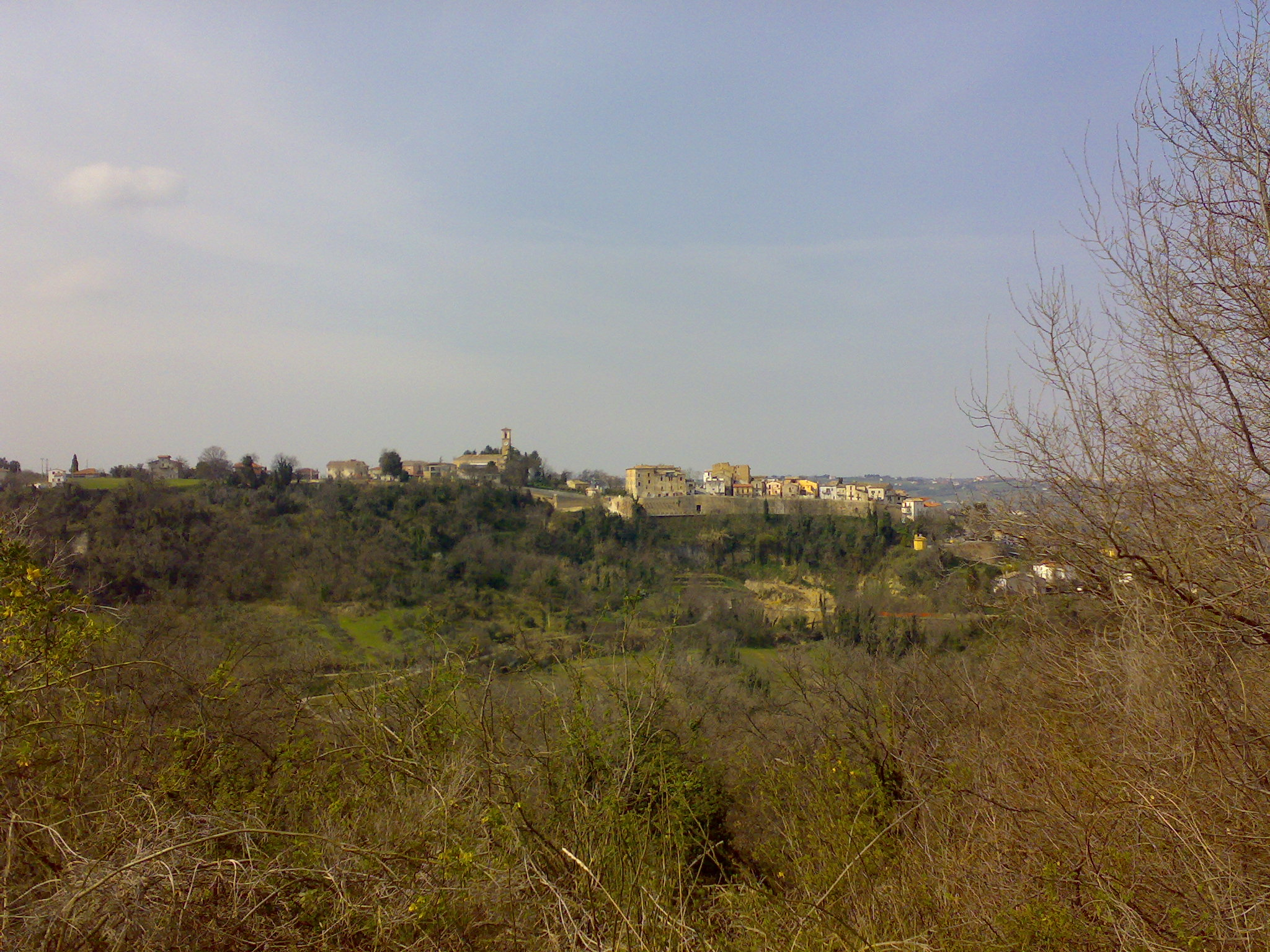

- Location within Italy Location within Abruzzo
- Coordinates: 42°18′N 14°16′E
- Country: Italy
- Region: Abruzzo
- Province: Chieti (CH)
- Frazioni: San Antonio, San Pietro, Santa Maria, Turrimarchi, Curci, Pianagrande

Area
  - Total: 11.19 km^{2} (4.32 sq mi)
- Elevation: 289 m (948 ft)

Population (31 December 2004)
  - Total: 1,319
  - Density: 117.9/km^{2} (305.3/sq mi)
- Demonym: Aresi
- Time zone: UTC+1 (CET)
  - Summer (DST): UTC+2 (CEST)
- Postal code: 66010
- Dialing code: 0871
- Patron saint: St. John

Ari is a town and comune in the province of Chieti, Abruzzo, south-eastern Italy.

It is an agricultural center of the Frentan Sub-Apennines, located on a spur to the left of the river Dendalo.

== History ==
Human presence in early historic times is testified by a bronze statuette found nearby, currently in the Antiquarium Teatinum. The statue depicts a man with a kilt holding a plate in his right hand as a sign of offer or request to a deity. 1st century BC inscriptions have also been found.

The first historical mention of the village dates back to 870 AD, when, among the possessions of the abbey of Montecassino, is mentioned a sancti Petri on the site of modern Ari. The local monastery, thanks to the economic help given from the Normans, gradually increased reaching the apogee between the 10th and 11th century, when it included a library, an oratory and several possessions such as churches, lands, and mills. Two papal bills, one by Pope Alexander III of 1173 and one by Innocent III of 1208, reaffirm the belonging to the churchood of Chieti, while other privileges are confirmed in a bill of emperor Lothair II.

The monastery declined between 1400 and 1464 and, with the death of the last chaplain, the area fell under the local bishop's authority.

== Main sights ==
- Castle-palace, perhaps built as a noble mansion since the beginning. The merloned tower dates in fact from the 18th century.
- Church of San Salvatore, only partially existing
- Church of Madonna delle Grazie
