= Casacanditella =

- Comune
- Comune di Casacanditella
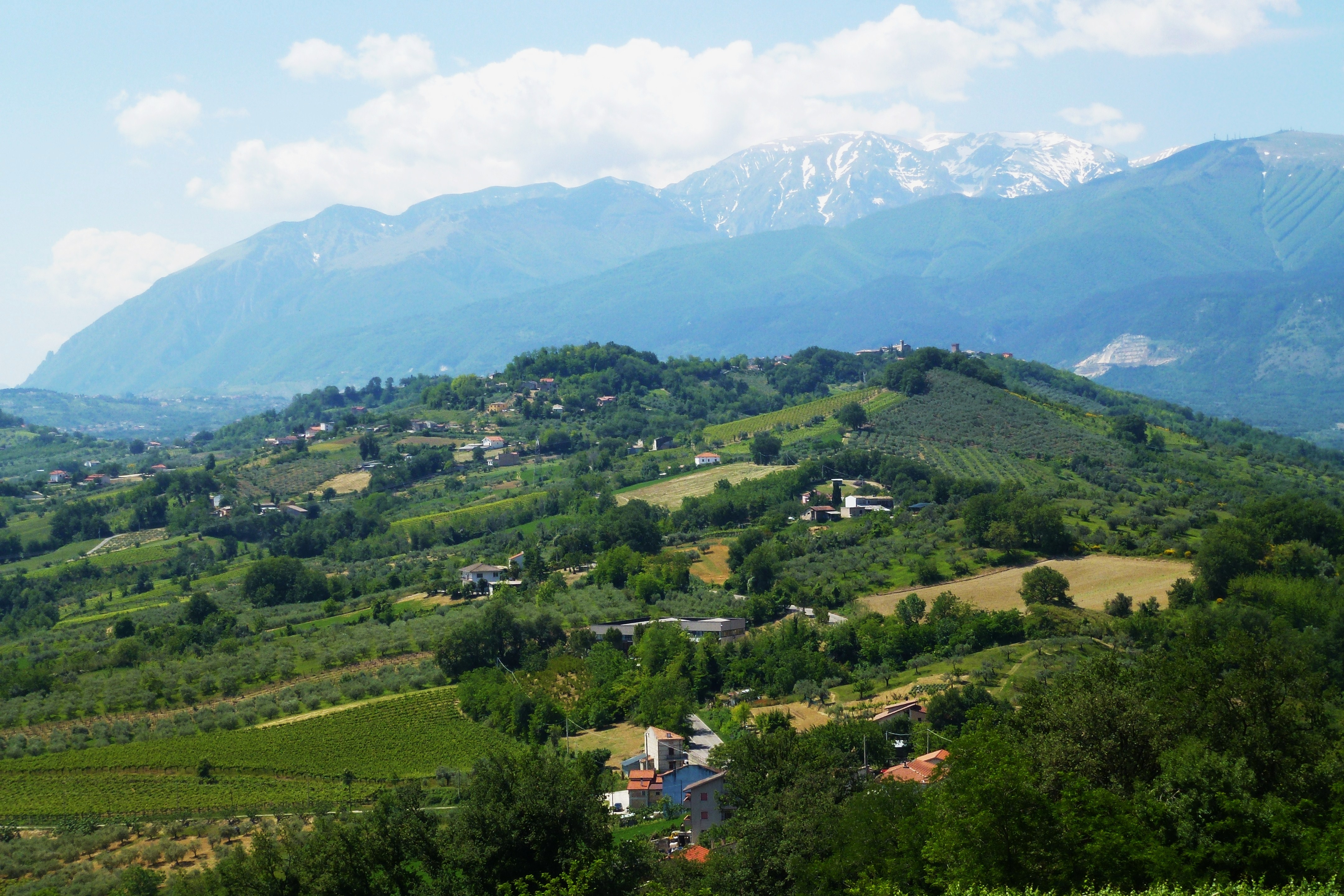

- Location within Italy Location within Abruzzo
- Coordinates: 42°15′N 14°12′E
- Country: Italy
- Region: Abruzzo
- Province: Chieti (CH)

Government
  - Mayor: Alessandro Monaco

Area
  - Total: 12.54 km^{2} (4.84 sq mi)
- Elevation: 432 m (1,417 ft)

Population (31 December 2021)
  - Total: 1,155
  - Density: 92.11/km^{2} (238.6/sq mi)
- Demonym: Casacanditellesi
- Time zone: UTC+1 (CET)
  - Summer (DST): UTC+2 (CEST)
- Postal code: 66010
- Dialing code: 0871
- ISTAT code: 069013
- Saint day: 3 September
- Website: Official website

Casacanditella is a comune and town in the province of Chieti in the Abruzzo region of central Italy.
