= Vacri =

- Comune
- Comune di Vacri
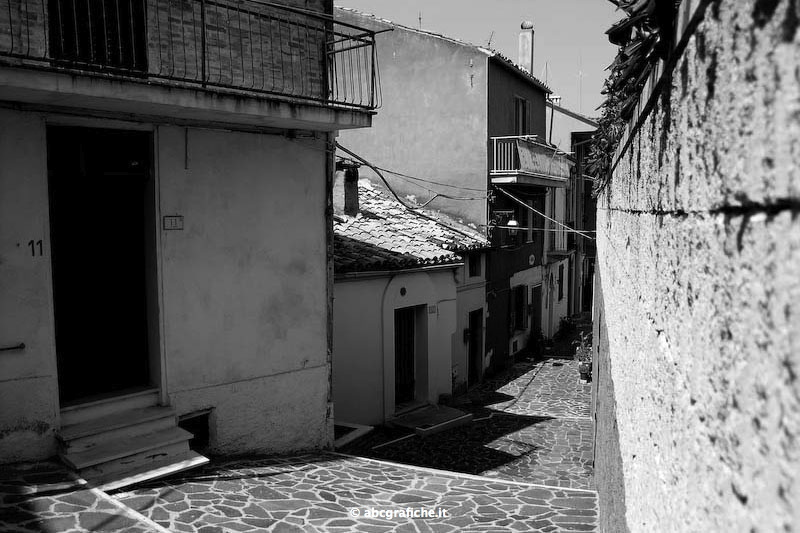

- Location within Italy Location within Abruzzo
- Coordinates: 42°18′N 14°14′E
- Country: Italy
- Region: Abruzzo
- Province: Chieti (CH)
- Frazioni: Fontanelle, Maiure, Porcareccia, Sant'Agata, San Vincenzo, Selva Porcareccio

Government
  - Mayor: Piergiuseppe Mammarella

Area
  - Total: 12.09 km^{2} (4.67 sq mi)
- Elevation: 310 m (1,020 ft)

Population (30 November 2014)
  - Total: 1,688
  - Density: 139.6/km^{2} (361.6/sq mi)
- Demonym: Vacresi
- Time zone: UTC+1 (CET)
  - Summer (DST): UTC+2 (CEST)
- Postal code: 66010
- Dialing code: 0871
- Patron saint: San Biagio
- Saint day: 3 February
- Website: Official website

Vacri is a comune and town in the province of Chieti in the Abruzzo region of southern Italy.
