= Guilmi =

- Comune
- Comune di Guilmi

- Location within Italy Location within Abruzzo
- Coordinates: 42°0′N 14°29′E
- Country: Italy
- Region: Abruzzo
- Province: Chieti (CH)

Area
  - Total: 12 km^{2} (4.6 sq mi)
- Elevation: 674 m (2,211 ft)

Population (2004)
  - Total: 486
  - Density: 40/km^{2} (100/sq mi)
- Time zone: UTC+1 (CET)
  - Summer (DST): UTC+2 (CEST)
- Postal code: 66050
- Dialing code: 0872

Guilmi is a comune and town in the Province of Chieti, in the Abruzzo region of Italy.

== Geography ==
It is located on a hill Colle San Giovanni nearby the Sinello valley, from which the skyline of the village clearly sticks out with the profile of the water cistern and the church of Santa Maria Immacolata.

== History ==
According to legend, the village, then called Tripaldi, lay on both banks of the Sinello river, until it was destroyed around 1720 by an invasion of termites.

== Festivals ==
The patron of Guilmi is Saint Nicholas of Bari, celebrated on May 4 and 5 with a procession in traditional costumes where the women carry on their heads the conca, that is a brass vase filled with traditional foods and sweets, which is sold in order to make offering to the church. Other feasts: St. Mary Magdalen on July 21. Sagra della ventricina on August 14. The ventricina is a typical salami from Guilmi made with pork meat and spices.
