= Casalanguida =

- Comune
- Comune di Casalanguida
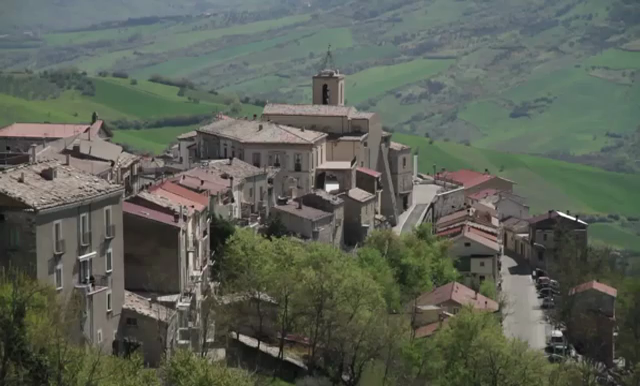

- Location within Italy Location within Abruzzo
- Coordinates: 42°2′N 14°30′E
- Country: Italy
- Region: Abruzzo
- Province: Chieti (CH)
- Frazioni: Cese, Valloni

Area
  - Total: 13 km^{2} (5.0 sq mi)
- Elevation: 470 m (1,540 ft)

Population (1 January 2007)
  - Total: 1,079
  - Density: 83/km^{2} (210/sq mi)
- Demonym: Casalanguidesi
- Time zone: UTC+1 (CET)
  - Summer (DST): UTC+2 (CEST)
- Postal code: 66031
- Dialing code: 0872
- ISTAT code: 069014
- Patron saint: San Nicola
- Saint day: 12 May

Casalanguida is a comune and town in the Province of Chieti in the Abruzzo region of Italy.

The region produces distinctive olive oil and wine; and is served by Pescara International Airport.

There is one ATM at the Posta Banca; it services international transactions.
