= Colledimacine =

Colledimacine Comune di Colledimacine
- Comune
- Municipality of Colledimacine
- Coat of arms

- Location within Italy Location within Abruzzo
- Coordinates: 42°0′N 14°12′E
- Country: Italy
- Region: Abruzzo
- Province: Chieti (CH)

Government
  - Mayor: Andrea Schina

Area
  - Total: 11 km^{2} (4.2 sq mi)
- Elevation: 770 m (2,530 ft)

Population (31 March 2017)
  - Total: 193
  - Density: 18/km^{2} (45/sq mi)
- Demonym: Colledimanicesi
- Time zone: UTC+1 (CET)
  - Summer (DST): UTC+2 (CEST)
- Postal code: 66010
- Dialing code: 0872
- ISTAT code: 069025
- Patron saint: San Mariano
- Saint day: 11 August
- Website: Official website

Colledimacine (Abruzzese: Còlle de Màcene) is a comune and town in the province of Chieti in the Abruzzo region of south-eastern Italy.
