= Frisa, Abruzzo =

Frisa
- Comune
- Comune di Frisa
- Location within Italy Location within Abruzzo
- Coordinates: 42°16′N 14°22′E
- Country: Italy
- Region: Abruzzo
- Province: Chieti (CH)
- Frazioni: Badia, Colle Alto, Colle della Fonte, Guastameroli, Vallone

Area
  - Total: 11 km^{2} (4.2 sq mi)
- Elevation: 237 m (778 ft)

Population (2018-01-01)
  - Total: 1,940
  - Density: 180/km^{2} (460/sq mi)
- Demonym: Frisani
- Time zone: UTC+1 (CET)
  - Summer (DST): UTC+2 (CEST)
- Postal code: 66030
- Dialing code: 0872
- ISTAT code: 069037
- Saint day: 27 July

Frisa (Abruzzese: Frìsce) is a comune and town in the Province of Chieti in the Abruzzo region of Italy.
