= Castelguidone =

- Comune
- Comune di Castelguidone
- Location within Italy Location within Abruzzo
- Coordinates: 41°49′N 14°31′E
- Country: Italy
- Region: Abruzzo
- Province: Chieti (CH)
- Frazioni: Inforchia, Piane

Government
  - Mayor: Donato Sabatin

Area
  - Total: 14 km^{2} (5.4 sq mi)
- Elevation: 775 m (2,543 ft)

Population (31 March 2017)
  - Total: 367
  - Density: 26/km^{2} (68/sq mi)
- Demonym: Castelguidonesi
- Time zone: UTC+1 (CET)
  - Summer (DST): UTC+2 (CEST)
- Postal code: 66040
- Dialing code: 0873
- Website: Official website

Castelguidone (Abruzzese: Lu Cuastìlle) is a comune and town in the province of Chieti in the Abruzzo region of Italy.
