= Dogliola =

- Comune
- Comune di Dogliola
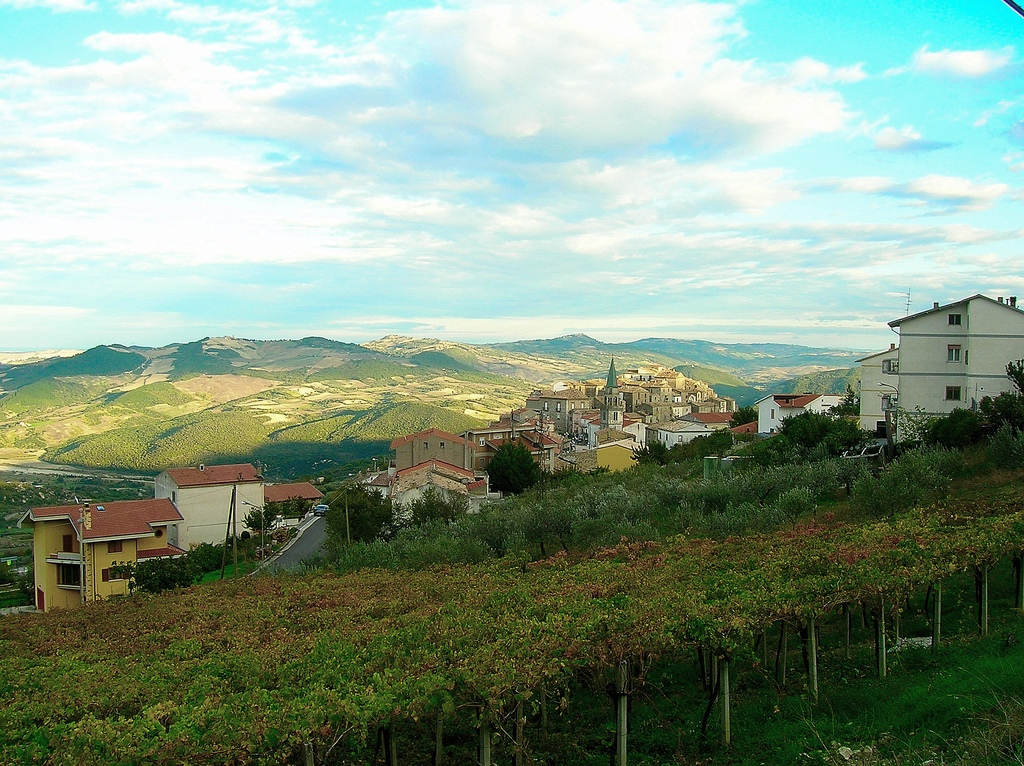

- Location within Italy Location within Abruzzo
- Coordinates: 41°57′N 14°38′E
- Country: Italy
- Region: Abruzzo
- Province: Chieti (CH)

Government
  - Mayor: Rocco D'Adamio

Area
  - Total: 11 km^{2} (4.2 sq mi)
- Elevation: 445 m (1,460 ft)

Population (31 July 2017)
  - Total: 356
  - Density: 32/km^{2} (84/sq mi)
- Demonym: Dogliolesi
- Time zone: UTC+1 (CET)
  - Summer (DST): UTC+2 (CEST)
- Postal code: 66050
- Dialing code: 0873
- Patron saint: St. Roch, St. Louis
- Saint day: 21 June
- Website: Official website

Dogliola (Abruzzese: Degliòle) is a village and comune in the province of Chieti in Abruzzo, Italy, 25 kilometres (16 mi) from Vasto, at an elevation of 445 m above sea level, overlooking the river Trigno valley.
