= Giovanni Boccardi (painter) =

Italian illuminator

Giovanni di Giuliano Boccardi (13 December 1459 – 1 March 1529) was an Italian illuminator active in Florence. He was also known as Boccardino il Vecchio or Maestro Giovanni.

According to archival evidence, he was born in Florence on 13 December 1459, the son of Giuliano Boccardi and Caterina di Bartolomeo Busini. Earlier scholarship had placed his birth in 1460.

During 1507–1523, Boccardi and his son Francesco painted choir-books for Monte Cassino and Perugia.
