= Canosa Sannita =

- Comune
- Comune di Canosa Sannita
- Coat of arms

- Location within Italy Location within Abruzzo
- Coordinates: 42°18′N 14°18′E
- Country: Italy
- Region: Abruzzo
- Province: Chieti (CH)
- Frazioni: Villa Moggio, Santa Maria d'Orni

Government
  - Mayor: Lorenzo Di Sario

Area
  - Total: 14.10 km^{2} (5.44 sq mi)
- Elevation: 231 m (758 ft)

Population (1 January 2007)
  - Total: 1,480
  - Density: 105/km^{2} (272/sq mi)
- Demonym: Canosini
- Time zone: UTC+1 (CET)
  - Summer (DST): UTC+2 (CEST)
- Postal code: 66010
- Dialing code: 0871
- Patron saint: Saints Philip and James
- Saint day: 1 May

Canosa Sannita (Italian pronunciation: [kaˈnoːza sanˈniːta]) is a comune and town in the province of Chieti, Abruzzo, central Italy.

Economy is mostly based on agriculture (wine, olive oil, fruit). Craftmanship and summer tourism are also active.

== See also ==
- Abruzzo (wine)
