= Roccaspinalveti =

- Comune
- Comune di Roccaspinalveti
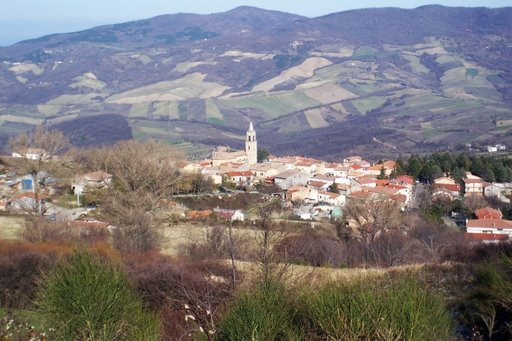

- Location within Italy Location within Abruzzo
- Coordinates: 41°56′N 14°28′E
- Country: Italy
- Region: Abruzzo
- Province: Chieti (CH)
- Frazioni: Vedi elenco

Area
  - Total: 32.92 km^{2} (12.71 sq mi)
- Elevation: 731 m (2,398 ft)

Population (2004)
  - Total: 1,607
  - Density: 48.82/km^{2} (126.4/sq mi)
- Demonym: Roccolani
- Time zone: UTC+1 (CET)
  - Summer (DST): UTC+2 (CEST)
- Postal code: 66050
- Dialing code: 0873
- ISTAT code: 069076
- Patron saint: San Pio
- Saint day: 11 July

Roccaspinalveti is a comune and town in the Province of Chieti in the Abruzzo region of Italy.

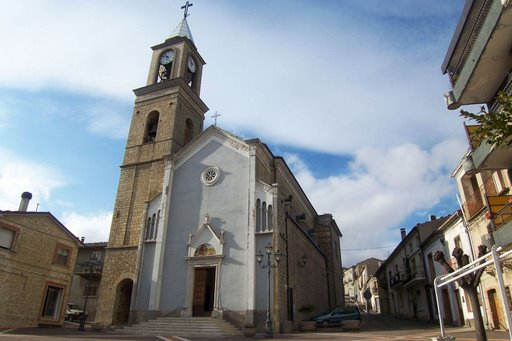
