= Sant'Eusanio del Sangro =

- Comune
- Comune di Sant'Eusanio del Sangro
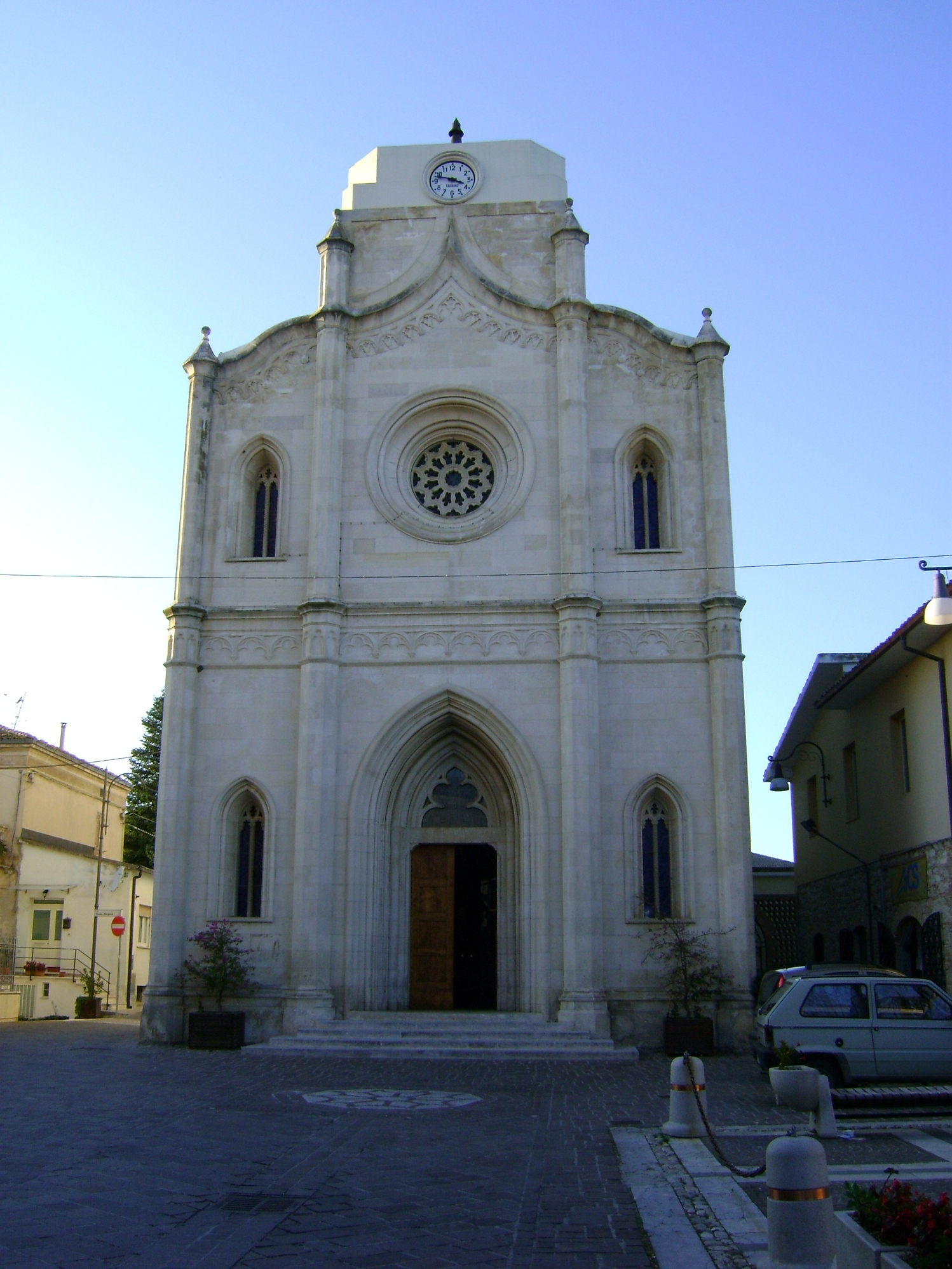
- Santa Maria Assunta

- Location within Italy Location within Abruzzo
- Coordinates: 42°10′N 14°20′E
- Country: Italy
- Region: Abruzzo
- Province: Chieti (CH)
- Frazioni: Brecciaio, Candeloro, Castellata Forestieri, Castellata Tori, Castello, Cotti, Fonte Paduli, Passoterrato, Piana delle Mele, Santa Lucia, Saponelli, Villa Rosato

Government
  - Mayor: Raffaele Verratti

Area
  - Total: 23.96 km^{2} (9.25 sq mi)
- Elevation: 200 m (660 ft)

Population (31 December 2021)
  - Total: 2,279
  - Density: 95.12/km^{2} (246.4/sq mi)
- Demonym: Santeusaniesi
- Time zone: UTC+1 (CET)
  - Summer (DST): UTC+2 (CEST)
- Postal code: 66037
- Dialing code: 0872
- Patron saint: St. Philip Neri
- Saint day: 26 May
- Website: Official website

Sant'Eusanio del Sangro (Abruzzese: Sànde Sàgne) is a comune and town in the Province of Chieti in the Abruzzo region of Italy.
