= Giuliano Teatino =

- Comune
- Comune di Giuliano Teatino
- Location within Italy Location within Abruzzo
- Coordinates: 42°18′N 14°17′E
- Country: Italy
- Region: Abruzzo
- Province: Chieti (CH)
- Frazioni: Madonna della Neve, San Cataldo, San Rocco

Area
  - Total: 9 km^{2} (3.5 sq mi)
- Elevation: 270 m (890 ft)

Population (Dec. 2004)
  - Total: 1,366
  - Density: 150/km^{2} (390/sq mi)
- Demonym: Giulianesi
- Time zone: UTC+1 (CET)
  - Summer (DST): UTC+2 (CEST)
- Postal code: 66010
- Dialing code: 0871
- Patron saint: St. Anthony
- Saint day: March 16
- Website: Official website

Giuliano Teatino is a comune and town in the province of Chieti in the Abruzzo region of Italy. It is located on a hill between the streams Venna and Dendalo, tributaries of the Foro River, and is a medieval burgh dating from the 11th century. It was a fief, among the others, of the Orsini and the Caracciolo.

Giuliano Teatino is a member of Cittaslow.
