= Gulf of Vasto =

Bay of the Adriatic Sea

The Gulf of Vasto is a large bay of the southern Adriatic Sea in Abruzzo, Italy. It takes its name from the city of Vasto, that faces the gulf. It is situated between Punta Penna and the border between Abruzzo and Molise.

== Description ==
The main commercial port of the city, the Port of Vasto, is in the area of the ancient port in the gulf, where lies the Tower of Punta Penna (16th century), that watched out against the Turkish Invasions in 1500. In the same area is located the Punta Penna Lighthouse, rebuilt after the bombardments in 1944. It is 70 meters (233 feet) high. Near the lighthouse is situated the little church of "Santa Maria di Pennaluce", surrounded by traditional houses, inhabited by workers of the harbour.

Another section of the Vastese gulf is the Marina, located in the lower part of the ancient city. In the 1960s the Marina had a large urban development thanks to summer tourism. The administration of the cultural events is affidated to the "Comunità Golfo D'Oro di Vasto" (in Italian: Community of the Golden Gulf of Vasto). Ships and ferries leave the harbour for a little trip in the area, around the shoreline, but also for the Tremiti Islands.
