= Castelmauro =

- Comune
- Comune di Castelmauro
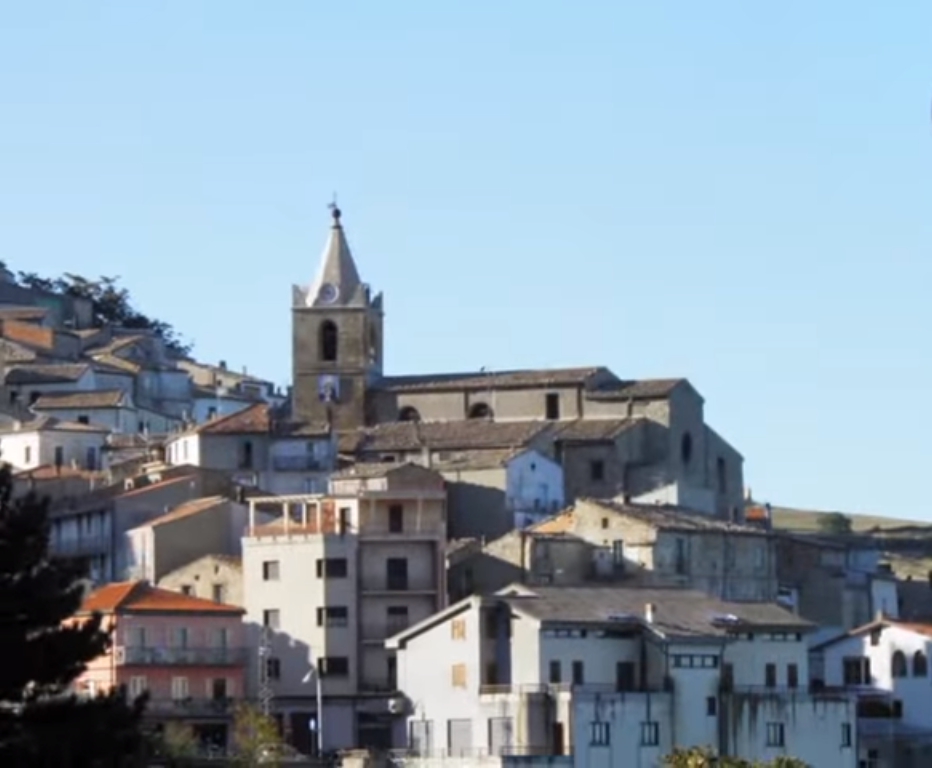
- View of Castelmauro

- Location within Italy Location within Molise
- Coordinates: 41°50′N 14°43′E
- Country: Italy
- Region: Molise
- Province: Campobasso (CB)

Government
  - Mayor: M° Flavio Boccardo

Area
  - Total: 43.62 km^{2} (16.84 sq mi)
- Elevation: 692 m (2,270 ft)

Population (30 November 2017)
  - Total: 1,452
  - Density: 33.29/km^{2} (86.21/sq mi)
- Demonym: Castelmauresi
- Time zone: UTC+1 (CET)
  - Summer (DST): UTC+2 (CEST)
- Postal code: 86031
- Dialing code: 0874
- Website: Official website

Castelmauro is a comune (municipality) in the Province of Campobasso in the Italian region Molise, located about 30 kilometres (19 mi) north of Campobasso.

Castelmauro borders the following municipalities: Acquaviva Collecroce, Civitacampomarano, Guardialfiera, Montefalcone nel Sannio, Roccavivara, San Felice del Molise, Trivento.

In September 1884, the small village of Castelluccio Acquaborrana originated a resolution to change its ancient name to that of a new one. Aside from Castelluccio (PG) itself, there have been a total of three such “Castelluccio” villages: 1) Acquaborrana, 2) Inferiore, and 3) Superiore. Inferior and Superiore were located near Tursi (Province of Potenza).

Acquaborrana was in Abruzzi-Molise, noted as “the loftiest village in the Apennines” having a population of 4,545 inhabitants and is situated on the southern east slope of Monte Mauro which has an elevation of 3,080 ft/ 939 m. Only 35 years earlier, it had only half the number of inhabitants at 2,428. The official proclamation read:

The town of Castelluccio Acquaborrana takes the name of Castelmauro

UMBERTO I, King of Italy

On the proposal of our Minister Secretary of State for Internal Affairs, President of the Council of Ministers; having regard to the resolution of the municipal council of Castelluccio Acquaborrana, dated 25 September 1884, with the request to be authorized to change the current name of the municipality to that of Castelmauro; having seen the municipal law as provincial March 20, 1865, letter A, we have decreed to decree:

The Municipality of Castelluccio Acquaborrana, in the province of Campobasso, will change its current name to that of Castelmauro, starting from 1 February 1885.

We order, etc. - Given in Rome, on 22 January 1885
