= Pietraferrazzana =

- Comune
- Comune di Pietraferrazzana
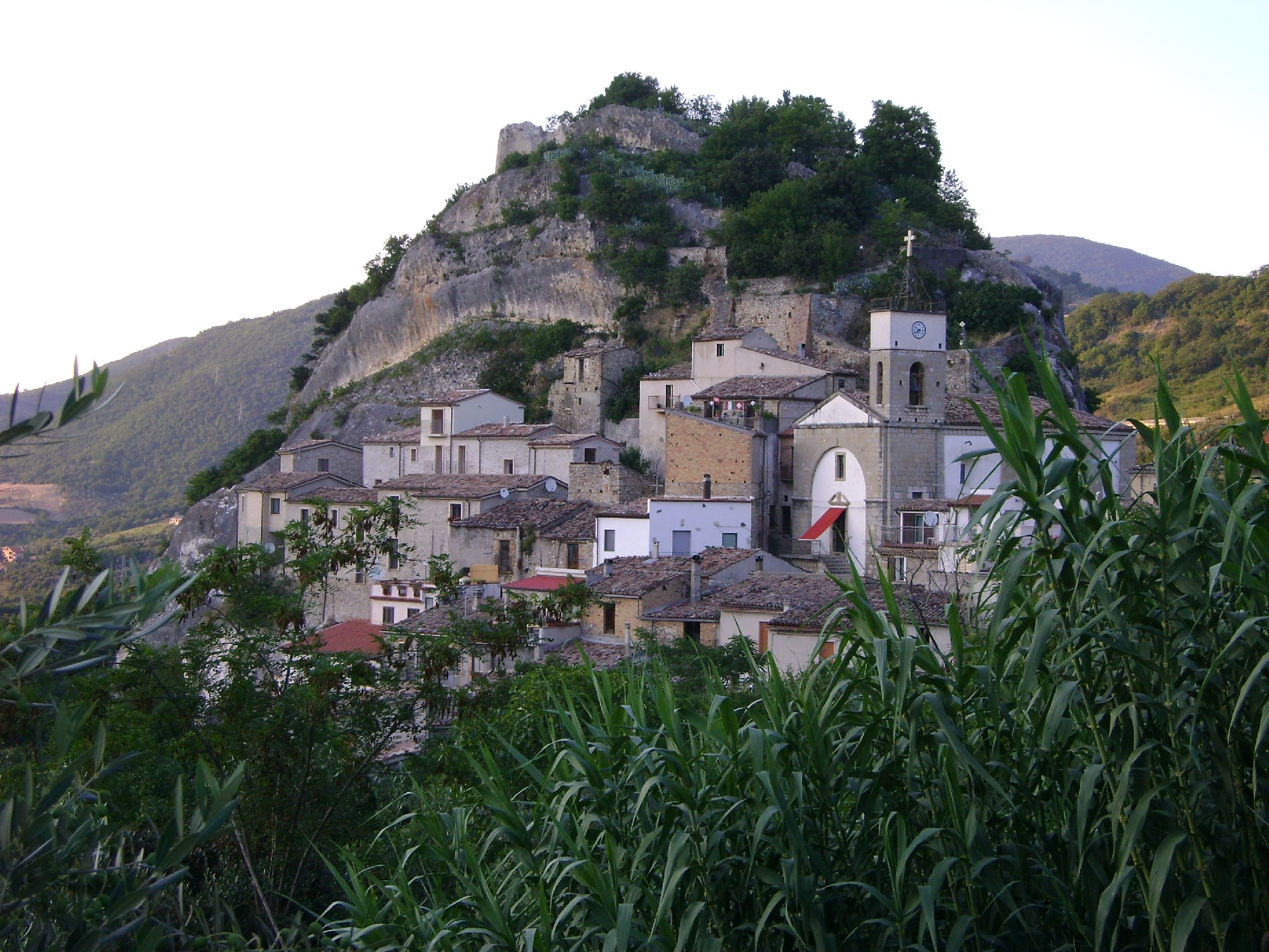
- View of Pietraferrazzana

- Location within Italy Location within Abruzzo
- Coordinates: 41°58′N 14°22′E
- Country: Italy
- Region: Abruzzo
- Province: Chieti (CH)

Government
  - Mayor: Ciro Carpineta

Area
  - Total: 4 km^{2} (1.5 sq mi)
- Elevation: 357 m (1,171 ft)

Population (31 December 2021)
  - Total: 130
  - Density: 33/km^{2} (84/sq mi)
- Demonym: Pietraferrazzanesi or Pietresi
- Time zone: UTC+1 (CET)
  - Summer (DST): UTC+2 (CEST)
- Postal code: 66040
- Dialing code: 0872
- ISTAT code: 069103
- Patron saint: St. Victoria
- Saint day: 23 December
- Website: Official website

Pietraferrazzana is a comune and town in the province of Chieti in the Abruzzo region of central Italy.
