= San Buono =

- Comune
- Comune di San Buono
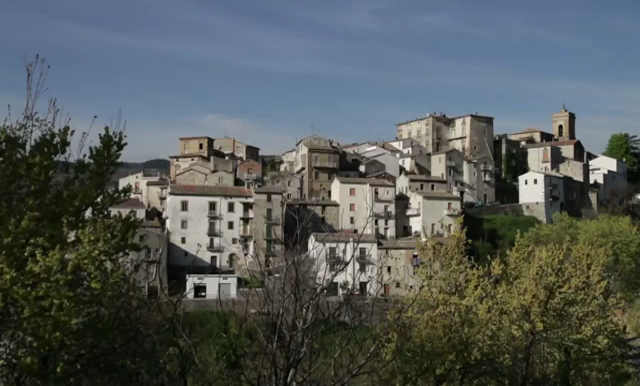
- A panorama image of San Buono.

- Location within Italy Location within Abruzzo
- Coordinates: 41°59′N 14°34′E
- Country: Italy
- Region: Abruzzo
- Province: Chieti (CH)

Government
  - Mayor: Nicola Zerra (since 2019)

Area
  - Total: 25.27 km^{2} (9.76 sq mi)

Population (2024)
  - Total: 853
  - Density: 33.8/km^{2} (87.4/sq mi)
- Demonym: Sanbuonesi
- Time zone: UTC+1 (CET)
  - Summer (DST): UTC+2 (CEST)
- Postal code: 66050
- Website: www.comune.sanbuono.ch.it/it

San Buono is a comune and town in the Province of Chieti in the Abruzzo region of Italy.
