= Carunchio =

- Comune
- Comune di Carunchio
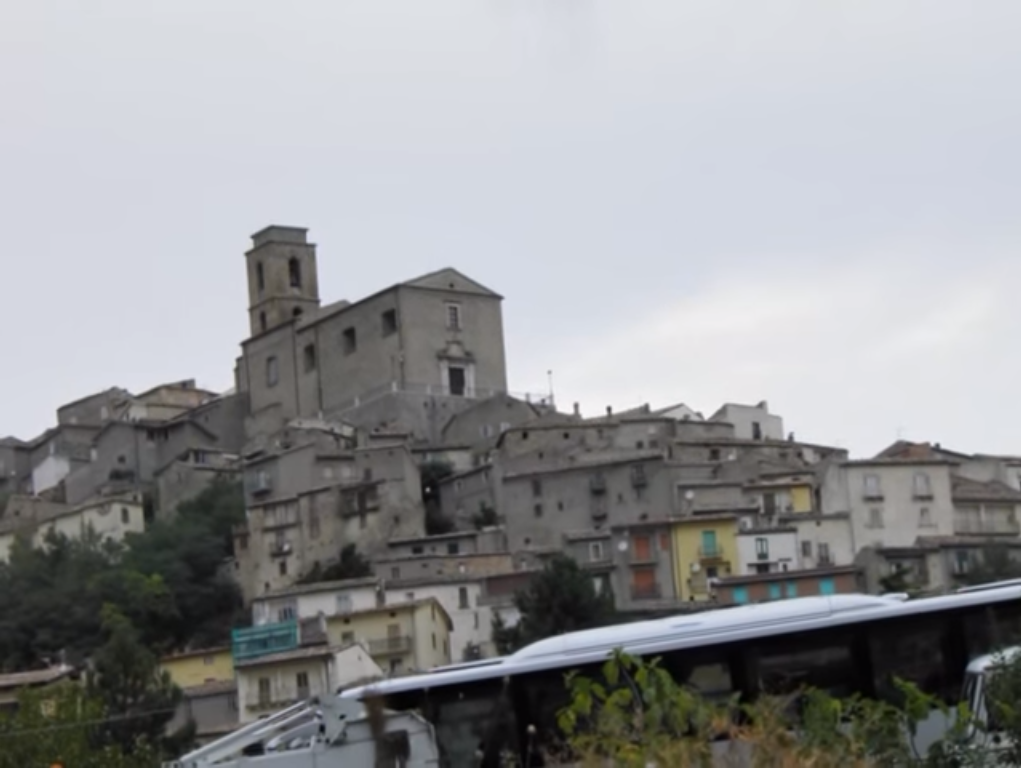

- Location within Italy Location within Abruzzo
- Coordinates: 41°55′N 14°32′E
- Country: Italy
- Region: Abruzzo
- Province: Chieti (CH)
- Frazioni: Cerreto, Pedicone

Government
  - Mayor: Gianfranco D'Isabella

Area
  - Total: 32.56 km^{2} (12.57 sq mi)
- Elevation: 714 m (2,343 ft)

Population (1 January 2021)
  - Total: 604
  - Density: 18.6/km^{2} (48.0/sq mi)
- Demonym: Carunchiese(i)
- Time zone: UTC+1 (CET)
  - Summer (DST): UTC+2 (CEST)
- Postal code: 66050
- Dialing code: 0873
- Patron saint: Sant'Antonio
- Saint day: 18 August

Carunchio is a comune and town in the province of Chieti in the Abruzzo region of Italy.

== History ==
The first mention dates back to 1173 in a papal bull that confirmed the boundaries of the diocese of Chieti. It was later held by the d'Avalos and Caracciolo families.

Formerly the town was in another area, perhaps in Taverna, but then was moved to where it is today in medieval times, because of raids by Saracens and Slavs.
