= Pennadomo =

- Comune
- Comune di Pennadomo

- Coat of arms

- Location within Italy Location within Abruzzo
- Coordinates: 42°00′N 14°19′E
- Country: Italy
- Region: Abruzzo
- Province: Chieti (CH)

Government
  - Mayor: Nicola Frattura

Area
  - Total: 11.02 km^{2} (4.25 sq mi)
- Elevation: 460 m (1,510 ft)

Population (31 December 2021)
  - Total: 216
  - Density: 19.6/km^{2} (50.8/sq mi)
- Demonym: Pennadomesi
- Time zone: UTC+1 (CET)
  - Summer (DST): UTC+2 (CEST)
- Postal code: 66040
- Dialing code: 0872
- Patron saint: St. Lawrence
- Saint day: August 10
- Website: Official website

Pennadomo (Abruzzese: La Pènne) is a comune and town in the province of Chieti in the Abruzzo region of Italy.

The town comprises 11.3 square kilometres (4.4 mi^{2}), in hill country 430 metres (1,410 ft) above sea level. In the 2001 national census the town had a population of 358 inhabitants, members of 173 families. The town had 12 companies and 2 administrative offices employing a total of 53 of the population. The population had fallen by 57 persons (14 percent) from the 1991 census.
