= Celenza sul Trigno =

- Comune
- Comune di Celenza sul Trigno
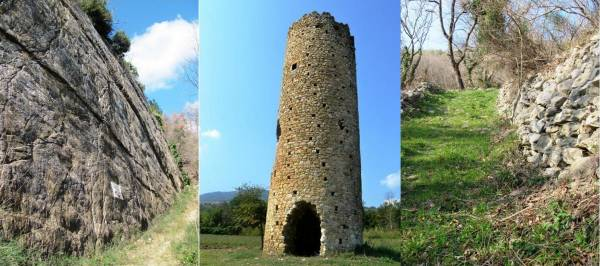

- Location within Italy Location within Abruzzo
- Coordinates: 41°52′N 14°34′E
- Country: Italy
- Region: Abruzzo
- Province: Chieti (CH)
- Frazioni: Martinelle, Strette

Government
  - Mayor: Walter Di Laudo

Area
  - Total: 22.68 km^{2} (8.76 sq mi)
- Elevation: 646 m (2,119 ft)

Population (31 December 2017)
  - Total: 899
  - Density: 39.6/km^{2} (103/sq mi)
- Demonym: Celenzani
- Time zone: UTC+1 (CET)
  - Summer (DST): UTC+2 (CEST)
- Postal code: 60050
- Dialing code: 0873
- Patron saint: San Donato
- Saint day: 7 August
- Website: Official website

Celenza sul Trigno (Abruzzese: Celènze) is a comune and town in the province of Chieti in the Abruzzo region of southern Italy.
