= Trabocchi Coast =

Costa dei Trabocchi (Trabocchi Coast)
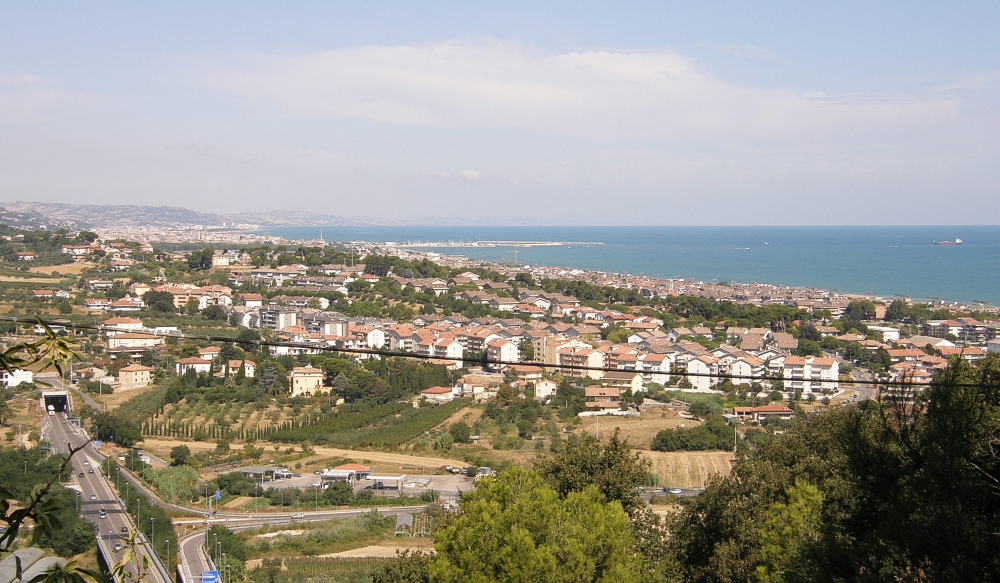
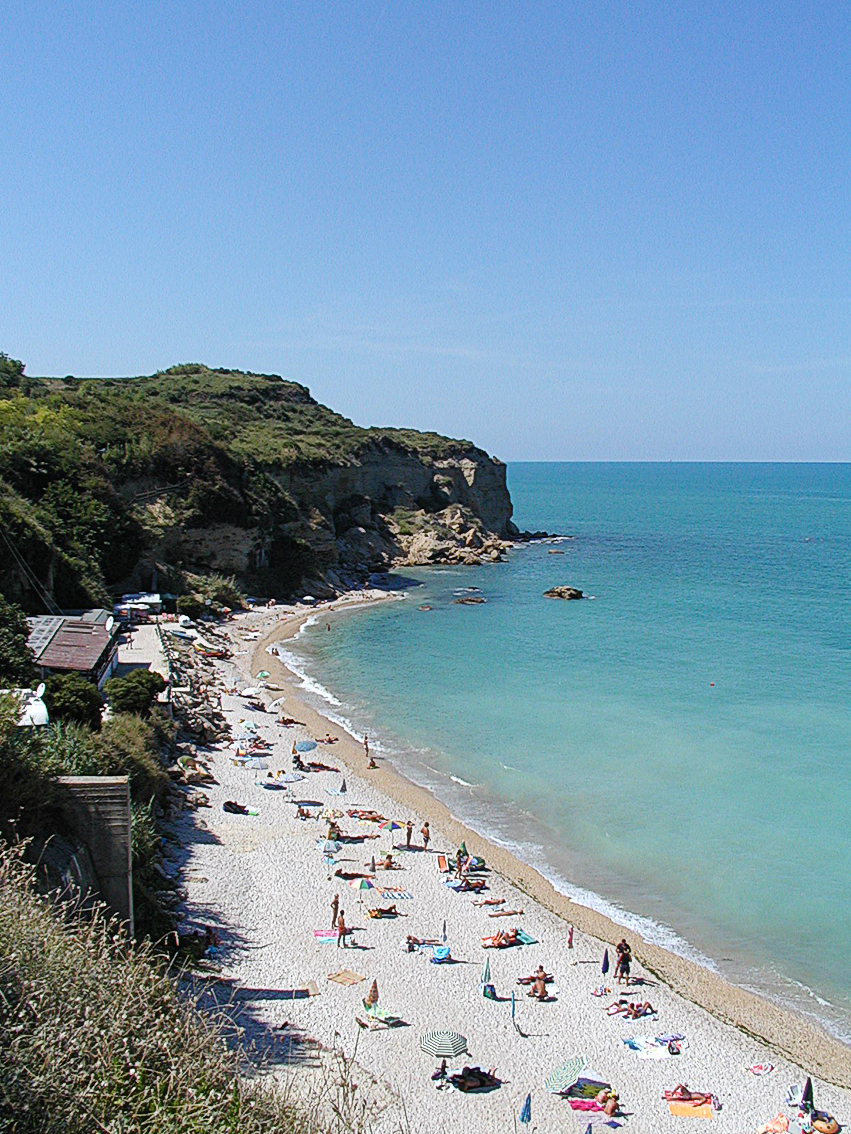
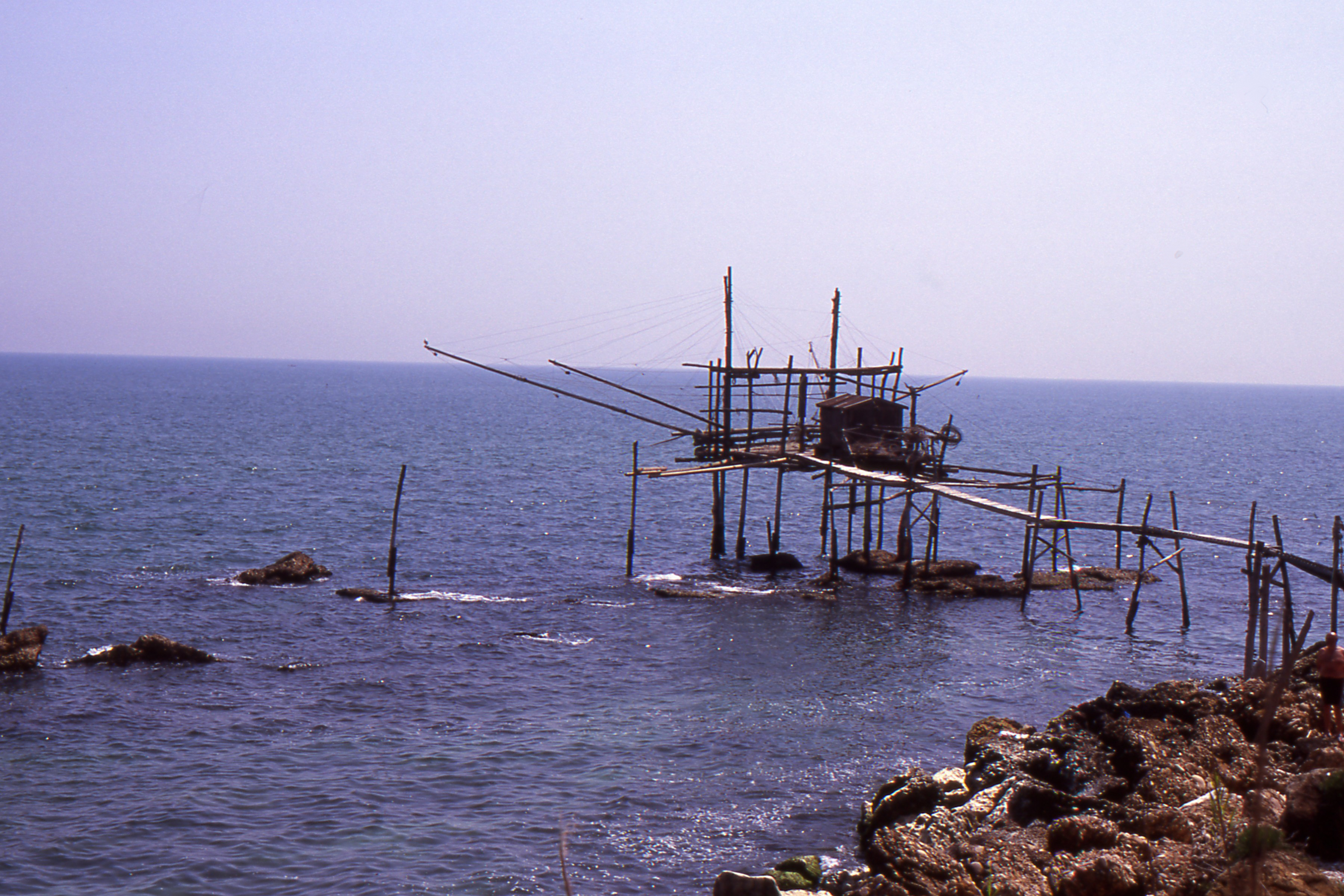
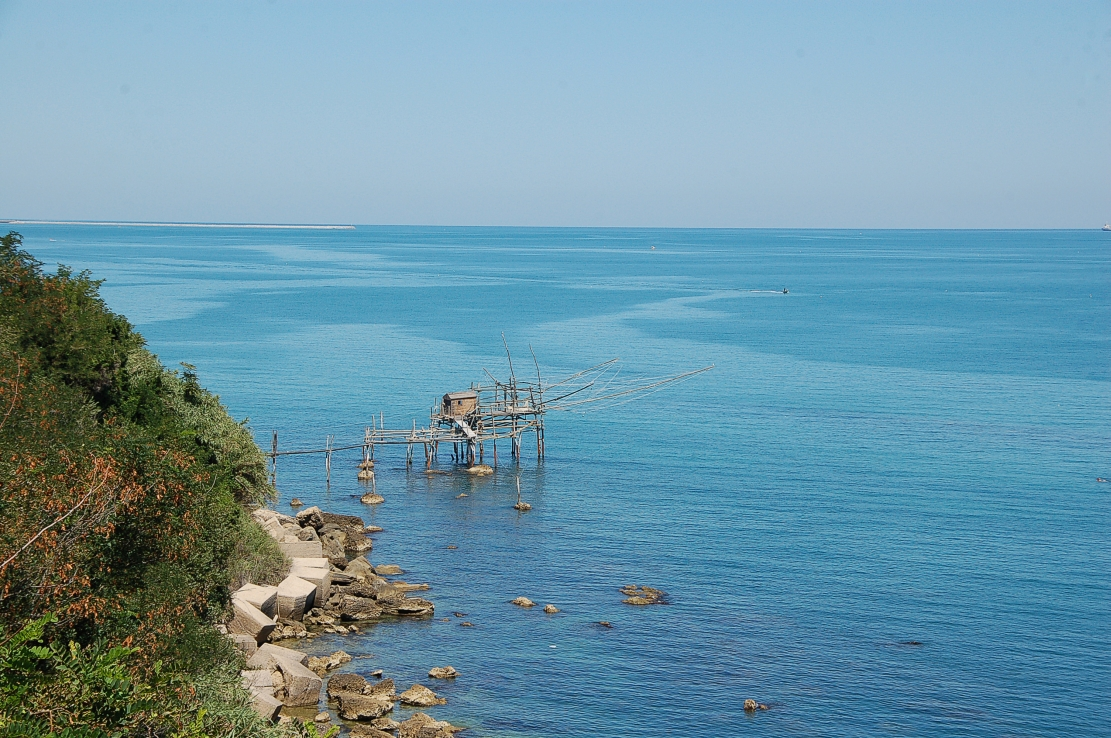
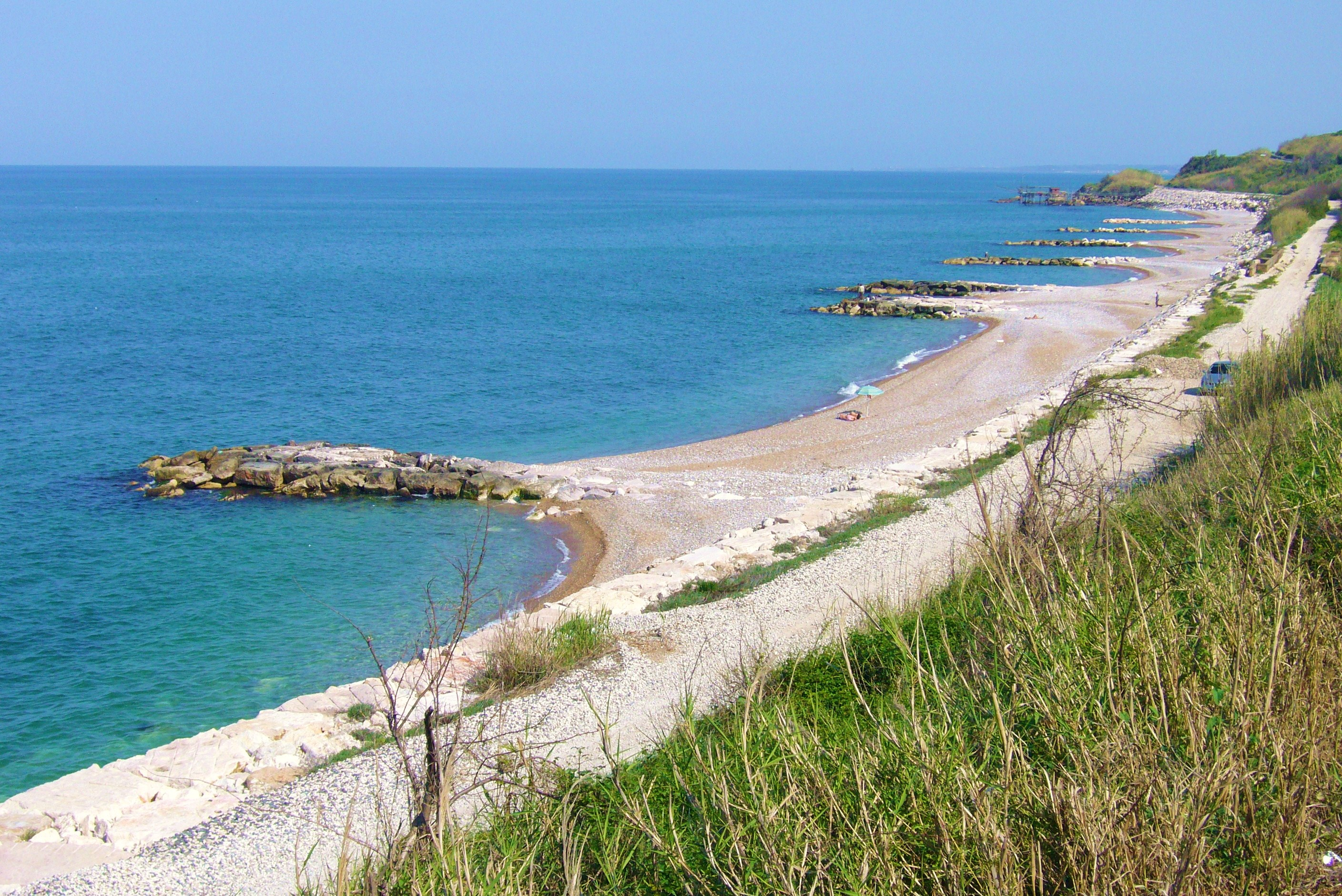
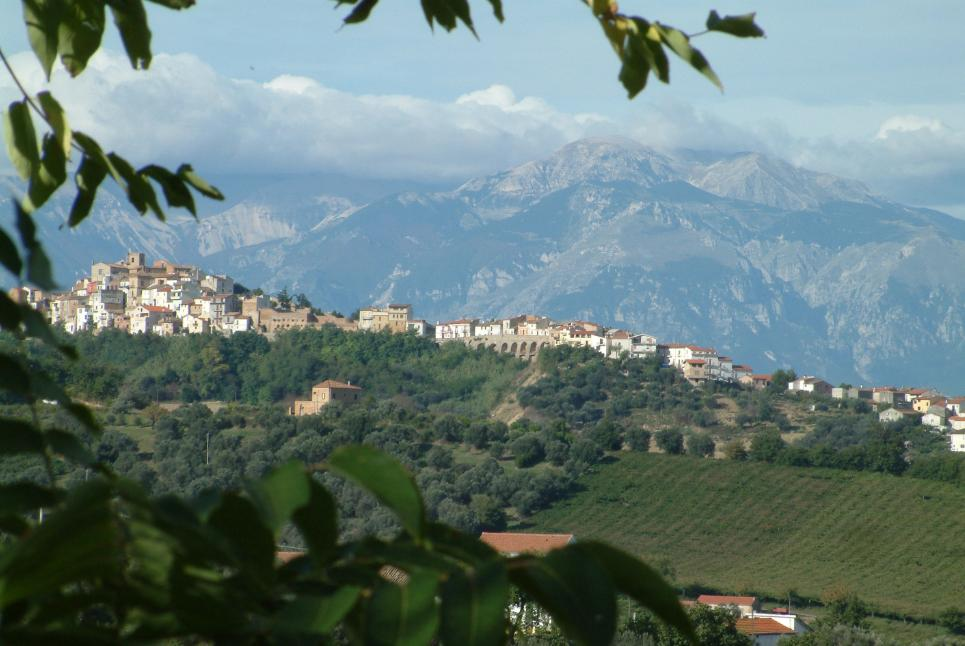
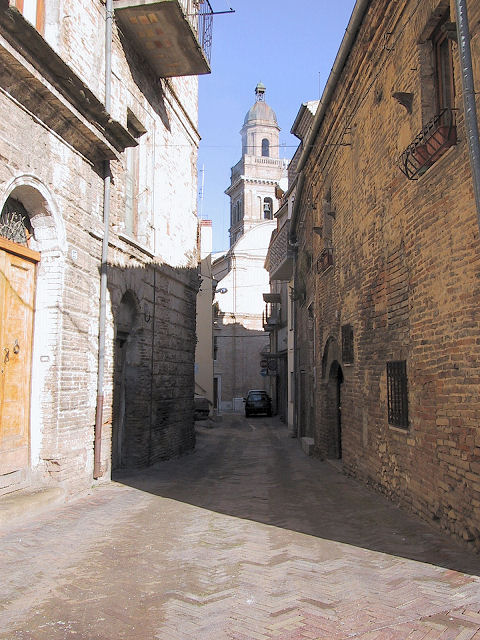
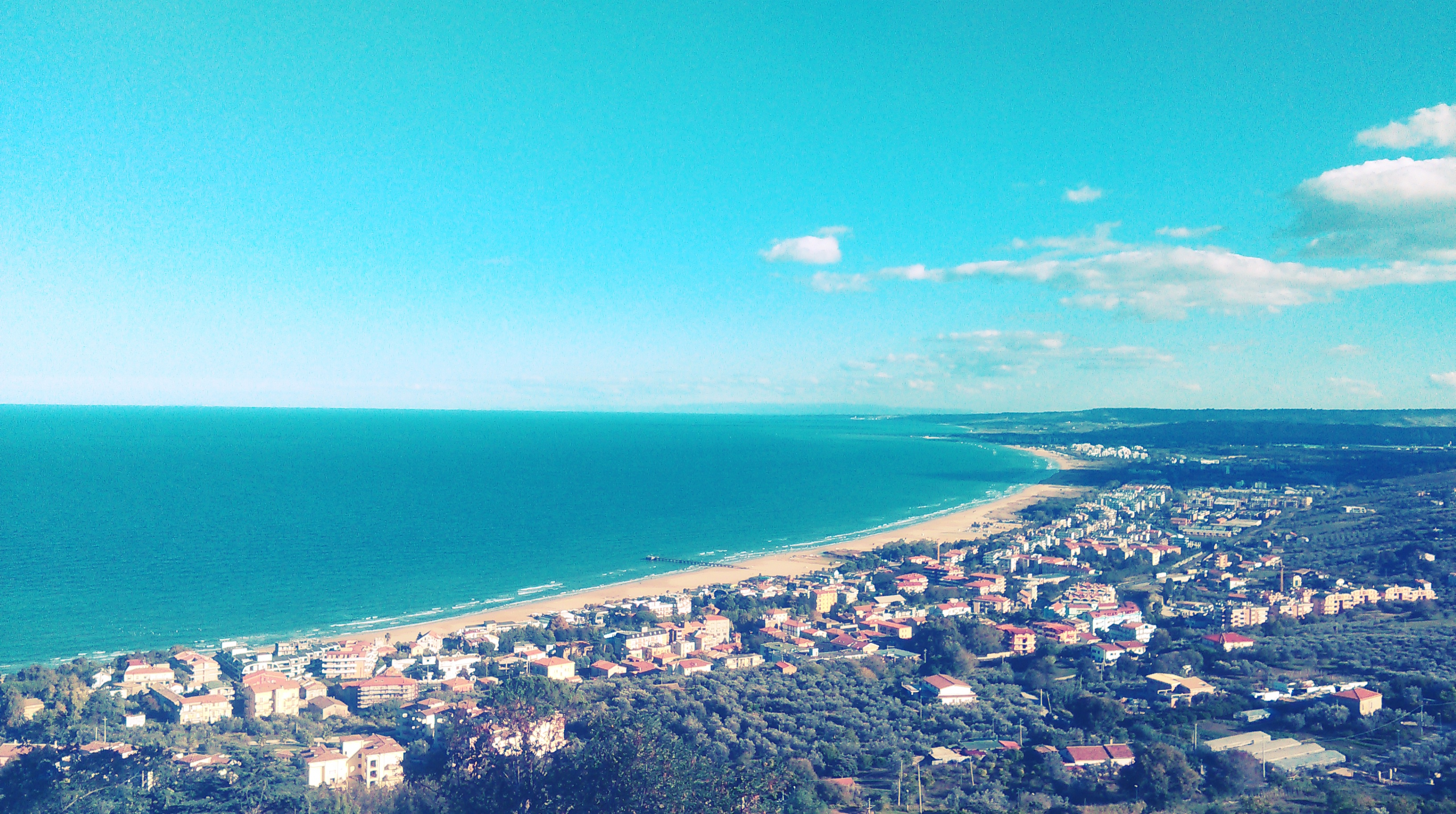
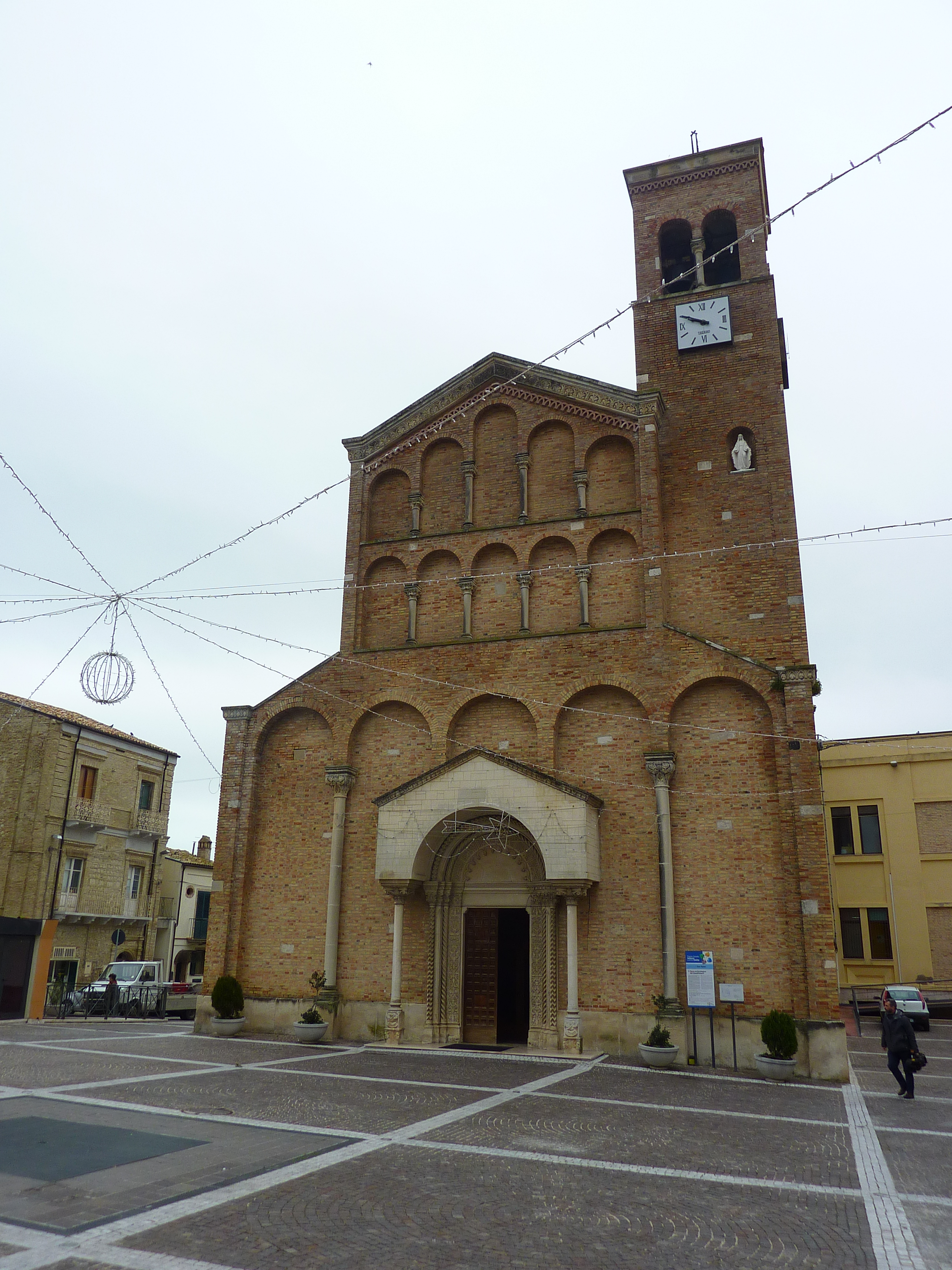
- From top down, left to right: panoramic view of Francavilla al Mare, Ortona, San Vito Chietino, Rocca San Giovanni, Fossacesia, Torino di Sangro, Casalbordino, Vasto, and San Salvo
- Interactive map of Costa dei Trabocchi (Trabocchi Coast)
- Coordinates: 42.2535°N 14.4334°E
- Country: Italy
- Regione: Abruzzo
- Province: Chieti

The Trabocchi Coast, which corresponds to the coastal stretch Adriatic of province of Chieti (Abruzzo), is a 70-kilometer coast from Ortona to San Salvo, in Italy. It comprises a number of coves and reefs below the hills that end at the Adriatic Sea marked by the spread of Trabucco – fishing machines on piles. Many of the towns on the Coast maintain their own characteristics and traditions.

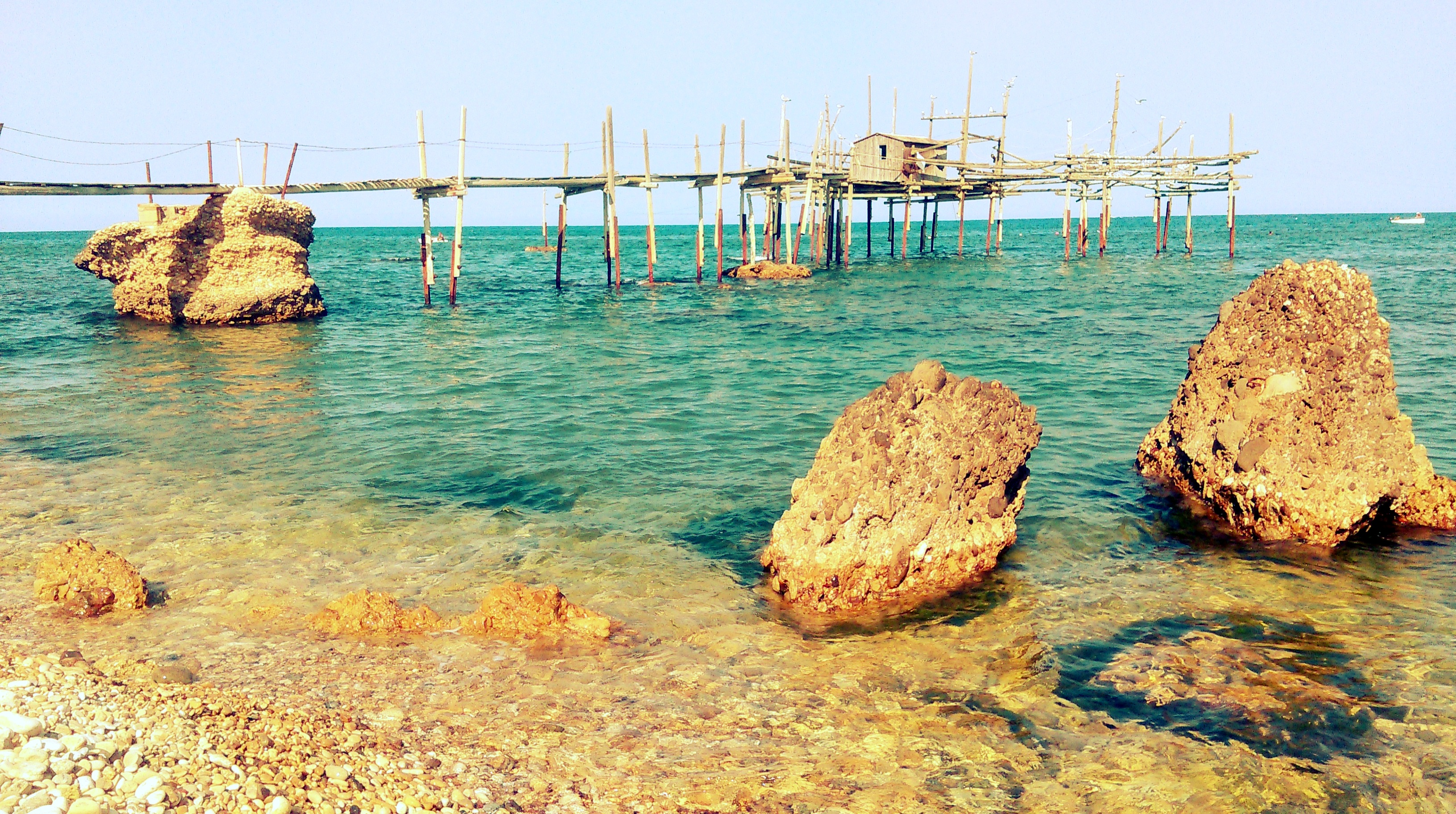
Trabocco

== Municipalities ==
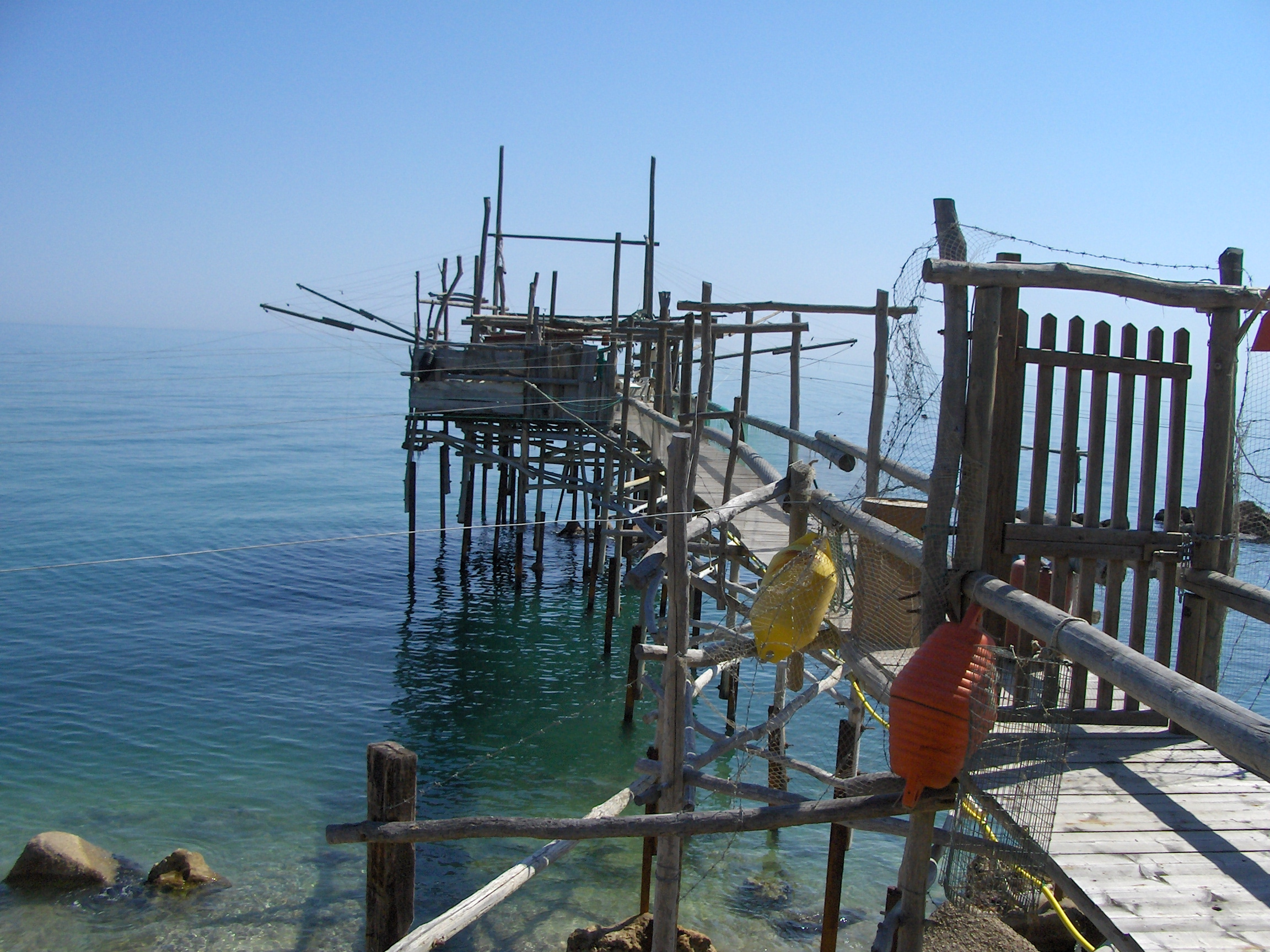
One of the many overflow of San Vito Chietino

The municipalities that compose it are part of the province of Chieti and are as follows:

- Francavilla al Mare
- Ortona
- San Vito Chietino
- Rocca San Giovanni
- Fossacesia
- Torino di Sangro
- Casalbordino
- Vasto
- San Salvo

== Geography ==
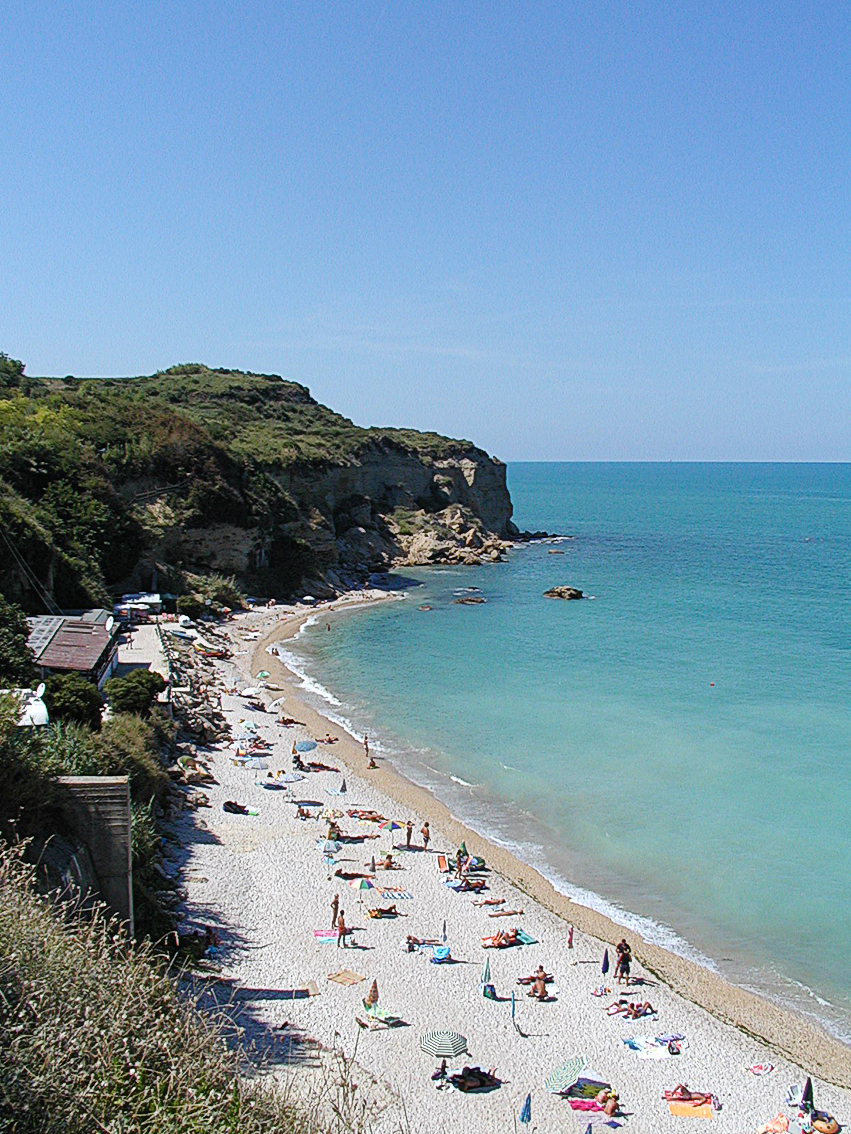
Ortona

The coastal strip begins in the north at the mouth of the Foro river (between the municipalities of Francavilla al Mare and Ortona) and ends in the south at the mouth of the Trigno river. It is varied in appearance, with stretches of low and sandy beach (as in Francavilla, Ortona, Casalbordino, Vasto and San Salvo) and areas of shingle beach in Fossacesia and Torino di Sangro, as well as high and rocky sections in San Vito Chietino and Rocca San Giovanni and stretches of pebbles, often separated by cliffs; the presence of the trabocchi on the coast, however, also continues towards the south, along the entire Molise coast up to the Gargano.

The coast winds through hills and valleys that end on the sea, creating natural environments of various kinds. The urbanization that characterizes the Adriatic coast from Rimini to Ortona is not as much in evidence here, even if building speculation and "francavillizzazione” (the construction of buildings close to the coastline that limit access and visibility of the sea, as happened in Francavilla al Mare) threaten the integrity of the natural environment.

== Economy ==
The region has a strong economic induction due to tourism and exceptional landscape of the coast which is a symbolic of Italy.

== Cycle track ==
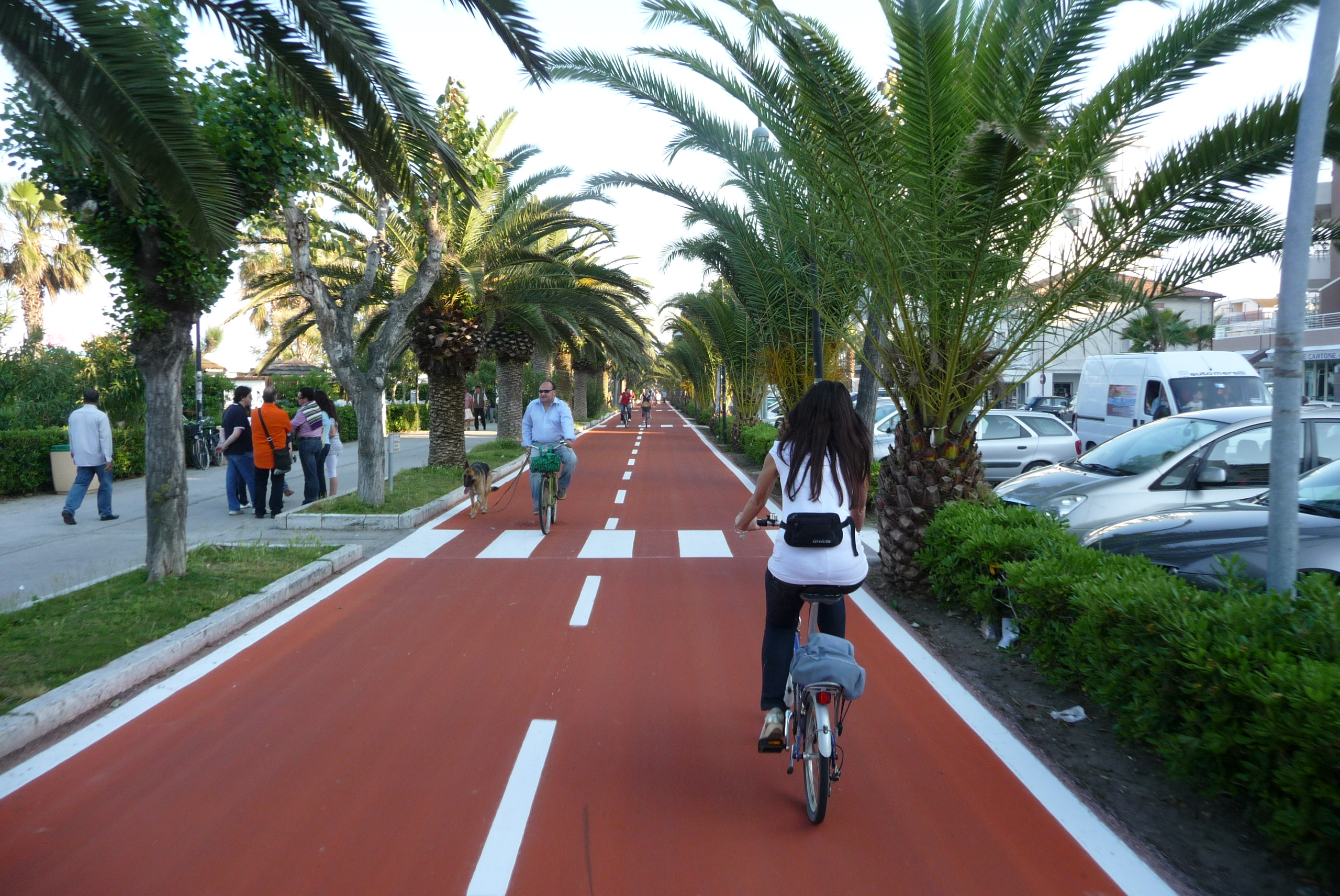
Cicle track, Alba Adriatica (Teramo)

Along the Trabocchi coast there are plans for an Adriatic cycle way (1000 km, to run along the Adriatic coast from the Delta of the River Po to Apulia) along the abandoned line of the Adriatic railway (49 km).

== Blue Flag ==
Due to the quality of its water, the Trabocchi Coast is one of the most ones of Italian Adriatic Coast, by the Blue Flag beaches.

== Beaches ==
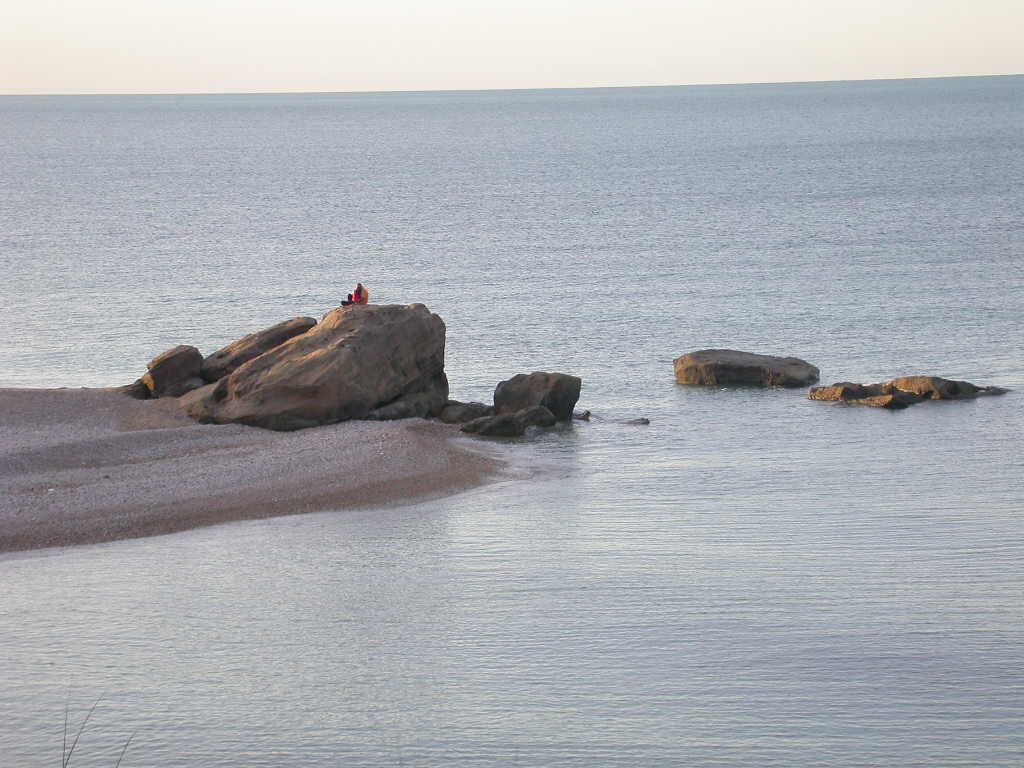
Le Morge beach

- Lido Riccio (Ortona)
- Punta Ripari di Giobbe (Ortona)
- Lido Saraceni (Ortona)
- Punta Acquabella (Ortona)
- Punta Mucchiola (San Vito)
- Molo di San Vito Marina
- Calata Turchino (San Vito)
- Punta del Guardiano (San Vito)
- Valle Grotte (San Vito)
- Punta Cavalluccio (Rocca San Giovanni)
- Costa di Fossacesia
- Golfo di Venere (Fossacesia)
- Le Morge (Torino di Sangro)
- Punta Penna (Casalbordino -Vasto)
- Punta Aderci (Vasto)
- Punta Vignola (Vasto)
- Lido di San Salvo Marina

== Trabocchi ==
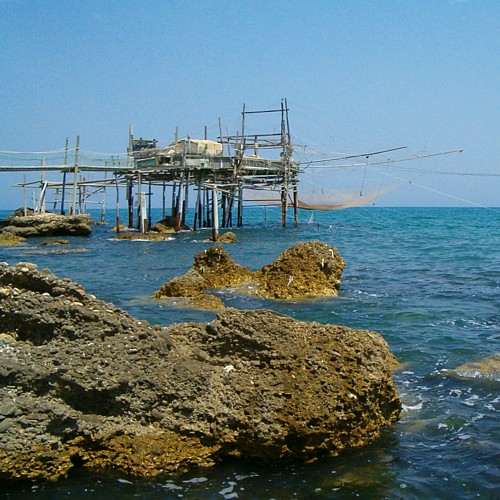
Trabucco in Fossacesia (Abruzzo)

Many trabocchi of the coast have been converted into restaurants.

- Trabocco Fosso Canale
- Trabocco Punta Tufano
- Trabocco San Gregorio
- Trabocco Turchino
- Trabocco Valle Grotte
- Trabocco Sasso della Cajana
- Trabocco Punta Isolata
- Trabocco Punta Cavalluccio
- Trabocco Pesce Palombo
- Trabocco Punta Punciosa
- Trabocco Punta Rocciosa
- Trabocco Le Morge
- Trabocco di Casalbordino
- Trabocco di Punta Penna
- Trabocco di Vasto Marina
- Trabocco Zi' Nicola di San Salvo

== San Vito and D’Annunzio ==
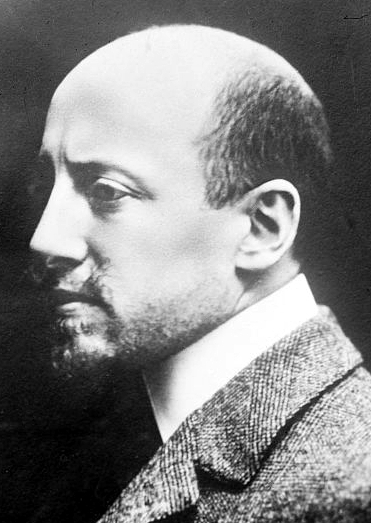
Portrait of Gabriele d'Annunzio

... a small rural house consists of two rooms on the first floor of a small room on the ground floor and a porch; and, next, a large vegetable garden of orange and other fruit trees, and under the sea cliffs, endless views of coastline and sea mounts, and above all, a great freedom, as a retreat of holy hermits .. .

— (Gabriele d'Annunzio, in a letter to Barbara Leoni)

The seaside town of San Vito Chietino is famous because the stretch of Trabocchi Coast, halfway between San Vito and Fossacesia, there is a hermitage where the 800 was built there a home to fishermen, that Gabriele d'Annunzio in 1889 bought and renovated it for his personal living with her lover Barbara Leoni. The house and the hermitage everything is called hermitage D'Annunzio, or promontory D'Annunzio, and is now a private museum. Architectural style seems to be a typical building of the nineteenth century rural architecture of Abruzzo. The part of the building used by the poet is not experiencing any degradation. The plant has a square base. The facade on the square is on two levels with elements in medieval style Lombard. On the ground floor there is a porch that follows the upstairs including the central part of the facade is advanced to the rest of the building. On the sides there are two arches. The front is in sandstone.

D'Annunzio as a setting also a part of his novel Il trionfo della morte (1894), in which the protagonist Giorgio Aurispa arrives in the small village sanvitese with her lover Hippolyta. Back from disappointment in the country of Guardiagrele of the discovery of financial ruin of his noble family, Giorgio seeking rest in the sea, and studies the Thus Spake Zarathustra of Nietzsche, learning the philosophy of Superman. George, however, fails to fuse his naturalistic thought and what superoministico disruptive, and experience it first witnessing scenes of popular superstition in San Vito, when it is feared that a child is kidnapped at night by witches, and when a child is found drowned into the sea by his mother; and then going on pilgrimage in the nearby village of Casalbordino. There, at the Shrine of Our Lady of Miracles, Giorgio Aurispa is overwhelmed by the horror of superstition of local farmers, which are lowered to the states most miserable, reduced to larvae, to achieve the miracle of Madonna.

Today on the promontory restaurants have sprung up dedicated to the poet Pescara, and also a public park with a gazebo, where is buried the mistress of d'Annunzio: Barbara Leoni.

== Documentation ==
Between 2011 and 2012 the director Anna Cavasinni made a documentary lasting 58 minutes on the coast teatina relative to overflow. The documentary is titled precisely "The Trabocchi Coast" and is released on DVD. In these months being shown in major centers in the Abruzzo coast and the screening is followed by a debate with the public and with the authorities. The documentary is part of a project documentation and memory enhancement Abruzzo that the Cultural Association Territories-Link is conducting a long time.

== Current events ==
The Trabocchi coast has witnessed large scale popular mobilization starting in 2007 aimed at preventing the mining and refining of heavy sour crude in the area.

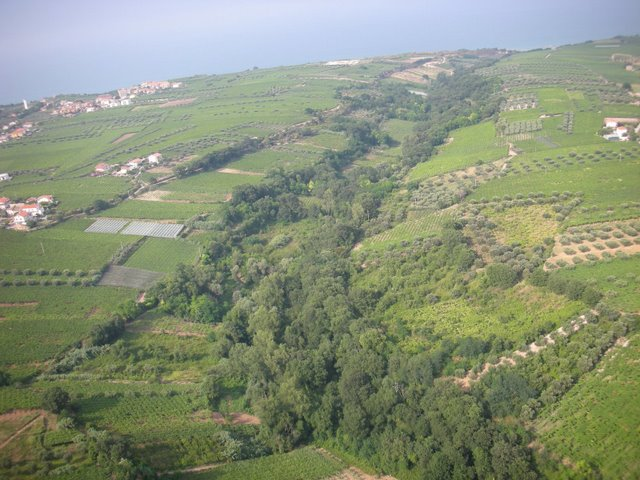
The site where ENI's oil center would have been built

The first oil related project that aroused concerns among residents was the so-called Centro Oli, a large dehydrosulphurization plant (127,000 m^{2}) that the oil company Eni had started planning in 2001. The affected area was contrada Feudo, part of the coastal town of Ortona, along the Trabocchi coast, and located in a prime wine production area. Local residents, led by American-born Dr. Maria Rita D'Orsogna, a scientist who grew up in Abruzzo, expressed strong opposition to the project. Although based in California, through blog writings and in-person presentations, she was able to alert locals to the negative effects on human health of exposure to hydrogen sulfide, as well as to other negative effects oil extraction would have on the agricultural economy, booming tourism, and quality of life along the Trabocchi Coast.

In 2009, a regional law (n. 14 of 2009), banned the extraction of crude oil in sensitive land areas in Abruzzo. One of the consequences of the law n.14 of 2009 was suspension of the construction of the Centro Oli. Due to vast, negative popular sentiment against Eni, the company has not pursued the project any further. However, throughout 2007-2016 other domestic and international oil and gas companies had submitted separate projects for hydrocarbon exploitation along the Trabocchi coast, both onshore and offshore. The most prominent was Ombrina Mare oil field, which called for the construction of an offshore platform to extract and process sour crude oil via an FPSO. It was first proposed by the now defunct UK-based Mediterranean Oil and Gas. The company conducted preliminary testing in 2008 by setting up a jackup rig and by drilling preliminary wells 5.5 km from shore. Offshore projects are not affected by the 2009 regional law.

Mobilization against Ombrina Mare grew into a regional, and then national case, with several large scale protests taking place in 2010, with 5,000 participants in nearby San Vito Marina, in 2013, with 40,000 attendees in Pescara, and in 2015 with 60,000 protesters in Lanciano. D'Orsogna coordinated letter writing campaigns, held public debates with the oil companies, wrote a manifesto against Ombrina Mare on the independent newspaper Il Fatto Quotidiano, and obtained support from the Catholic Church.

After several iterations and laws attempting to ban oil drilling in the Adriatic sea, on 6 January 2016, the Italian Ministry of Economic Development announced its final re-introduction of the ban on exploration and production activity within 12 nautical miles of the coast of Italy. This ban, spurred by the Ombrina protests, effectively denied Rockhopper Exploration, the new proprietors of Ombrina Mare, the right to develop the field. The company was ordered to remove all related infrastructure on February 3, 2016.

More than nine years after exploitation operations commenced, the Ombrina Mare oil wells were capped and decommissioned in September 2016, without ever producing a drop of commercial oil.

Rockhopper Exploration argued that the new limits on drilling caused unfair reductions on their potential future profits, and sued the Italian government in 2017 through an arbitration under the Energy Charter Treaty. In 2022 the company was awarded 250 million euros in damages, including interest, but the Italian government appealed to annul the award. In 2024 Rockhopper Exploration insured its remaining assets in case the annulment is successful. Climate activists cite the Ombrina Mare case as a prime example of why European countries should exit the Energy Charter Treaty.

On June 3 2025, Rockhopper Exploration announced that Italy succeeded in having the entire Award annulled and that no payments will be awarded to the company.

=== Brand ===
On April 14, 2025, in order to incentivize, promote, and publicize the tourism sector on this stretch of coast, the Abruzzo region and various organizations, including the Chieti-Pescara Chamber of Commerce, created a recognition brand, which all businesses in the area can join to create a system and advertise the products of the coast itself.

== See also ==
- Economy of Abruzzo
- Cuisine of Abruzzo
- Tourism in Italy
- Tourism in Abruzzo
- Costa Giardino
