= Simonluca Perfetto =

- Born: 28 April 1977 (age 49); Pescara, Italy

Simonluca Perfetto (born 28 April 1977) is an Italian numismatist.

== Biography ==
He graduated from the "Gabriele D'Annunzio" State Classical High School in Pescara (region Abruzzo) and, after completing his military service, earned a law degree from the University of Teramo in 2004 with a thesis on the "Exegesis of Roman Law Sources", focusing on usurae and the Roman monetary system. Listed in the Chamber of Commerce of Chieti-Pescara’s register of numismatic experts following an examination, he is also registered as a numismatic consultant with the Court of Pescara and practices law. He obtained a PhD in History and Archaeology (specializing in Epigraphy and Numismatics) from the Complutense University of Madrid, with a thesis dedicated to the relationship between coinage and feudalism in the Kingdom of Naples.

Between 2009 and 2025, he published over one hundred scholarly works, based primarily on the analysis of previously unpublished archival sources. He identified numerous medieval mints—at least forty-three in total, that had not previously been documented in historical scholarship, including those of Amantea, Aquino, Fondi, Guardiagrele, Naples (during various periods), Rocca San Giovanni, Teramo, Termoli, Torre del Greco and Vibo Valentia.

Between 2020 and 2025, he proposed a re-evaluation of the role of the Naples mint during the Middle Ages, highlighting the production of foreign coinage and the minting of augustales and tarì—activities previously attributed solely to the mints of Messina and Brindisi.

In addition to participating in international historical and numismatic research projects, è he is engaged in the documentary reconstruction of the Norman-Swabian mint in Naples—a minting facility not documented in numismatic literature prior to 2020.

== Awards ==
In 2015, he received the "Memmo Cagiati" award from the Italian Academy of Numismatic Studies—presented during the XV International Numismatic Congress in Taormina—for the work "La unitat monetària de les Dues Sicílies pel català Francesc Ximenis. La magistratura de la seca i el Llibre de Comptes de la seca de Nàpols (1453-1454)".. In 2020, he received an award at the First Numismatic Literary Prize of the Republic of San Marino for "Alcune zecche inedite del Robertino autorizzate al culmine del regno di Roberto d'Angiò", published in the "Bulletin du cercle d'études numismatiques", 57-1 (2020).. In 2025, he received an honorable mention for the "Javier Conde Garriga 2024" award, conferred by the Asociación Numismática Española, for the work "L'impatto del feudalesimo aragonese nel Regno di Napoli. La moneta nei feudi di Napoli (1441-1498)".

== Main publications ==
=== Essays on numismatics ===
- "Aspetti politico-monetari all'epoca di Carlo V en el Reyno de Napoles, Aracne Editrice", Roma 2011
- "La unitat monetària de les Dues Sicílies pel català Francesc Ximenis. La magistratura de la seca i il Llibre de Comptes de la seca de Nàpols (1453-1454)", Ermes, Canterano (RM) 2015
- "I fiorini di conio fiorentino battuti a Napoli tra XIII e XV secolo", Aracne, Roma 2021
- "Tesori del Regno di Napoli da processi antichi", Aracne, Roma 2021
- "L'impatto del feudalesimo aragonese nel Regno di Napoli. La moneta nei feudi di Napoli (1441-1498)", Aracne, Roma 2023
- "Istituzioni di numismatica medievale. Una introduzione", Aracne, Roma 2025
- "Il nobile Leonardo de Zocchis alias Terracina e il corpus delle sue relazioni, in Archivio Storico per le Province Napoletane", CXXXI (2013), pp. 217-243
- "Instrucciónes para la cecca dela moneda de Nápoles ann 1543 1546 1561". Edizione commentata, in Quaderno di Studi XII (2017), Associazione culturale Italia numismatica, pp. 107-162
- "Gli ultimi tornesi del Regno di Napoli al mismo cuño del antiguo (1536-1542), in Rivista Italiana di Numismatica e Scienze Affini, CXIX (2018), pp. 179-198
- "Avemo libre d’ariento il quale metemo in zecha"; "i 'charlini' postumi battuti a Napoli al tempo di Giovanna II d’Angiò (1414-1435)", in Rivista Italiana di Numismatica e Scienze Affini, CXX (2019), pp. 227-270
- "La zecca di Napoli al culmine del Ducato 'normanno'", in Rassegna del Centro di Cultura e Storia Amalfitana, 61-62 (2021), pp. 63-92
- "En Nápoles, de la diferencias de las monedas: il capolavoro di Leonardo de Zocchis", in Rivista Italiana di Numismatica e Scienze Affini, CXXIV (2023), pp. 201-248
- "Primo nucleo di fonti sulla zecca sveva di Napoli", in Mémoire des Princes Angevins, 15 (2022-2023)
- "Un contributo alla catalogazione dei tarì federiciani", in Gaceta Numismática, 208 (2024), pp. 97-121
- "L'Augustale federiciano: nuove prospettive", in Eikón / Imago, 14 (2025), pp. 1-26
- "Secondo nucleo di fonti sulla zecca sveva di Napoli", in Espacio, Tiempo y Forma. Serie III. Historia Medieval, 38 (2025), 605-631
- "Un secolo di organizzazione produttiva della moneta a Napoli (1442-1546)", in Políticas económicas sobre el medio natural y su explotación (ss. XIV-XVI), a cura di G. Navaro Espinach e C. Villanueva Morte, Murcia 2025, pp. 361-382

=== Essays on other tipics ===
- "Il commercio dell'olio attraverso la via portuale della Pescara spagnola (1554-1557)", Museo delle Genti d'Abruzzo, Pescara 2014
- "L'altro volto di Benedetto Cotrugli, il mercante umanista", in Italica Belgradensia, (2016/1), pp. 7-19
- "Nota critica sulla diffusione della partita doppia nei libri mastri delle Zecche del Regno di Napoli. La Firma di Benedetto Cotrugli (Secc. XV-XVI)", in De Computis, Revista Española de Historia de la Contabilidad, 26 (Giugno 2017), pp. 6-26
- "«Era grandissima confusione che non se posseva ritrovarse quella scriptura che si desiderava e cercava»: il riordino dell’archivio della regia zecca di Napoli (1545-63)", in Archivio Storico per le Province Napoletane, CXXXVII (2019), pp. 243-280
- "Documenti per servire alla storia dei maestri razionali della Zecca di Napoli 1309-1562", in Nuova Rivista Storica, Anno CIV, Maggio-Agosto 2020, fasc. II, pp. 733-752
- "La Madonna Lauretana di Castellana (PE) e la Casula di Lanciano (CH): presenze eterogenee dell'Abruzzo angioino o di quello svevo", Pro loco Castellana di Pianella (PE), Bari 2020
- "Aspetti della storia medievale e moderna di Pianella", Costa Edizioni, Pescara 2022
- "«Canna e giurisdizione» di Pianella: per una cartografia del territorio (secc. XVI-XVIII)", Pianella 2025
