= Maria Rita D'Orsogna =

Italian-American mathematician and environmental activist

Maria Rita Rosaria D'Orsogna (born 1972) is an American applied mathematician and environmental advocate of Italian descent. She is a professor of mathematics at California State University, Northridge, where her research interests include mathematical biology, swarm behaviour, quantitative methods in criminology, and quantifying drug overdoses. She is also known for a successful campaign to prevent offshore drilling for oil in Abruzzo, Italy.

== Early life ==
D'Orsogna was born in The Bronx, New York, in 1972, to parents from Italy; they returned to Italy when she was a child, and she grew up in Abruzzo.

== Academics ==
D'Orsogna earned a laurea in physics from the University of Padua in 1996, focusing on statistical mechanics and mentored by Attilio L. Stella. After a master's degree from the University of Maryland, College Park in 1998, supervised by Theodore L. (Ted) Einstein, she completed a Ph.D. at the University of California, Los Angeles (UCLA) in 2003. Her dissertation, Charge transfer in DNA: the role of thermal fluctuations and of symmetry, was jointly chaired by Joseph Rudnick and Robijn Bruinsma.

She became a postdoctoral researcher in chemical engineering at the California Institute of Technology from 2003 to 2004, and then in the mathematics department at UCLA from 2004 to 2007. She took her present position as a professor in the mathematics department at California State University, Northridge (CSUN) in 2007. At CSUN, she also became affiliated with the Institute for Sustainability in 2008. She added an adjunct professorship in computational medicine at UCLA in 2012. At UCLA, she was associate director of the Institute for Pure and Applied Mathematics from 2018 to 2021.

The D'Orsogna model, used to describe the collective motion of self-propelled particles in physics, is named after her.

== Activism ==
After D'Orsogna learned in 2007 of a plan by Eni to begin onshore drilling in the Miglianico Oil and Gas Field near Ortona in Abruzzo, her mother's hometown, she began organizing against oil extraction and refining in the area, primarily devoted to agriculture and wine-making. In 2008 the nearby Ombrina Mare oil field was proposed for offshore development along the Trabocchi Coast; by 2010, her campaign had succeeded in blocking both plans and in leading to a new Italian law against drilling within five miles of the Italian coast and its marine parks. After continued pressure from her campaign, the drilling limits were expanded to 12 miles in 2016.

In 2022 this led to a large preliminary judgement for the corporate inheritor of the drilling project, Rockhopper Exploration, who argued that the new limits on drilling caused unfair reductions on their potential future profits. The International Centre for Settlement of Investment Disputes ruled in favor of Rockhopper Exploration and agreed with its claim that the Italian government had breached the Energy Charter Treaty. The preliminary judgement awarded Rockhopper Exploration 190 million GBP (230 million USD in 2022) plus interest. The Italian government appealed to annul this award. On June 3 2025, Rockhopper Exploration announced that the Italian government succeeded in having the arbitration award annulled and that no compensation would be ultimately paid.

The Ombrina Mare case is often cited in environmental law as a prime example of why European countries should exit the Energy Charter Treaty.

D'Orsogna's extensive efforts to educate and mobilize communities against the expansion of oil drilling activities have been instrumental in influencing public opinion and policy decisions related to environmental protection and sustainable development in Italy. She exposed political corruption, coordinated letter writing campaigns, obtained support from the Catholic Church, and held educational events with the general public. She frequently debated the oil companies, and authored an independent blog with a large following. The drilling restrictions enacted in 2016 and spearheaded by D'Orsogna effectively halted oil and gas drilling along the entire Italian coastline, protecting more than 50,000 square miles of marine waters from oil and gas development. Closer to her home, she has also opposed over-development in Santa Monica, California.

For her efforts, D'Orsogna was named ambassador from Abruzzo to the world in 2014, and has been called the "Italian Erin Brockovich".
