= Trabucco =

Adriatic ancient fishing machine

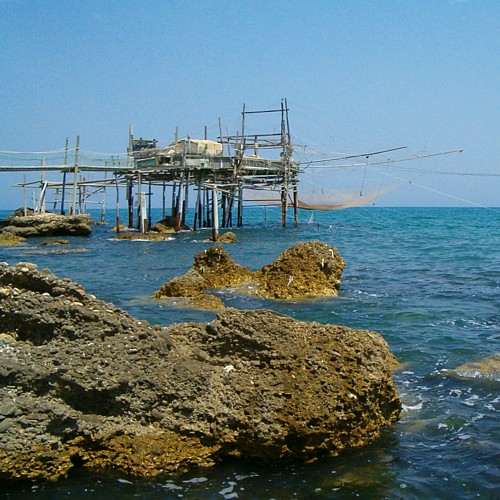
Trabucco in Fossacesia, Abruzzo

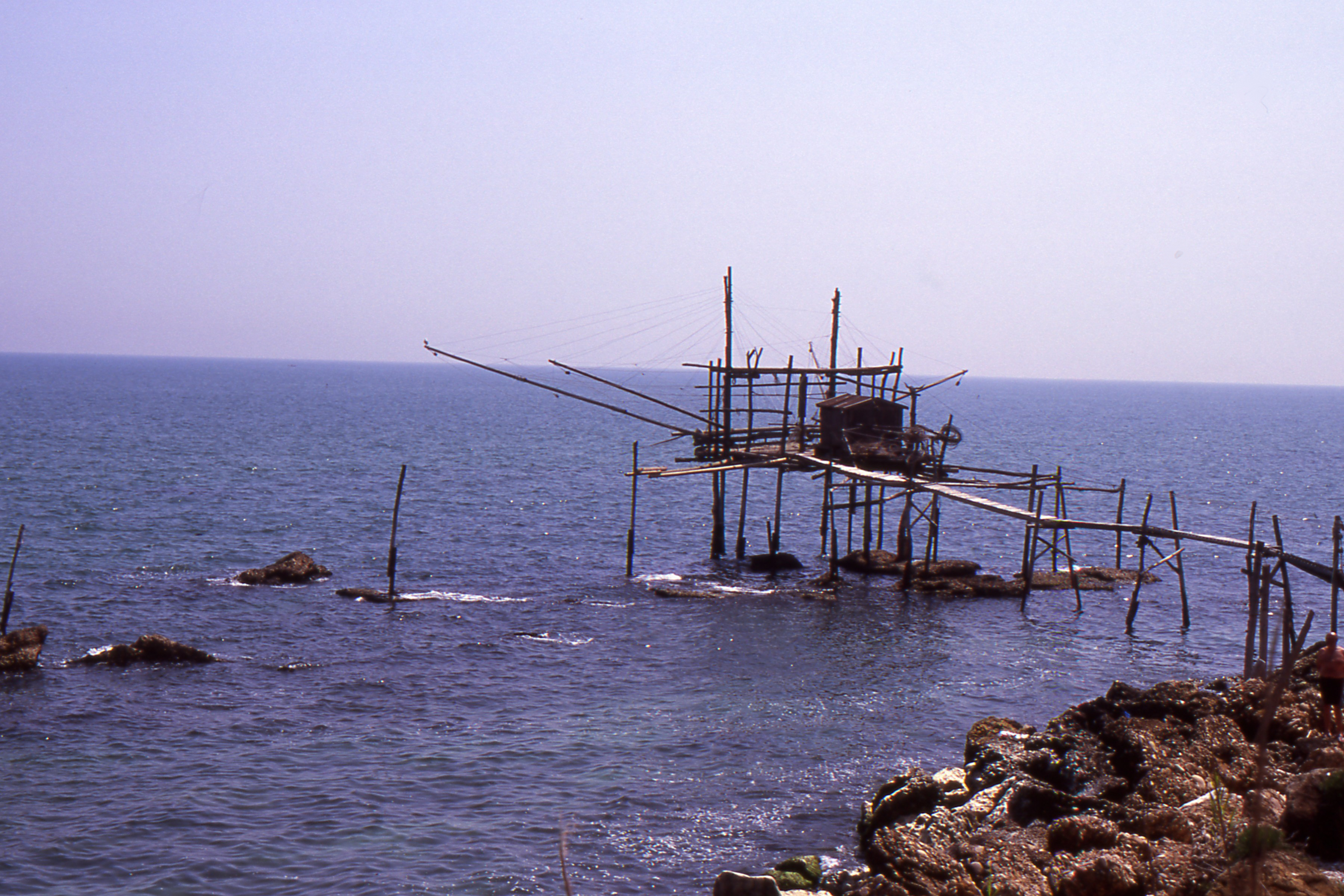
Overflow near Marina San Vito Chietino, in the Abruzzo Trabocchi Coast

A trabucco (Italian: [traˈbukko]), known in some southern dialects as trabocco or travocc, is an ancient fishing structure typical to the Adriatic shores of Abruzzo — famously dubbed the Costa dei Trabocchi (Trabocchi Coast) and the Gargano coast, where they are preserved as historical monuments within the Gargano National Park. These distinctive structures are prevalent along the southern Adriatic coastline, particularly in the Italian provinces of Chieti, Campobasso, and Foggia. Trabucchi can also be found on certain parts of the southern coast along the Tyrrhenian Sea.

== The trabocchi in literature ==
The renowned Italian poet Gabriele d'Annunzio was among the first to describe these structures in literature. In his work Il Trionfo della Morte he portrays a trabucco extending from the tip of a promontory, above a cluster of rocks, likening it to a colossal spider made entirely of planks and beams. He writes, "From the furthest point of the right promontory, over a group of rocks, a trabucco was extended, a strange fishing machine, all composed of boards and beams, resembling a colossal spider..." Moreover, d'Annunzio vividly captures the trabucco's skeletal form, resembling "the colossal skeleton of a prehistoric amphibian," bleaching white against the landscape. He describes the trabucco as a "great white skeletal structure protesting against the cliff...an erect and treacherous form in perpetual ambush, often contrasting the solitude's kindness." At hot mid-days and sunsets, it sometimes assumed formidable aspects, "…even in the most distant rocks were poles fixed to support the reinforcing ropes; countless small boards were nailed up the trunks to strengthen weak spots. The long struggle against the fury of the waves seemed inscribed on the great carcass through those knots, those nails, those devices. The machine seemed to live a life of its own, bearing the air and semblance of a living body."

== Construction features ==
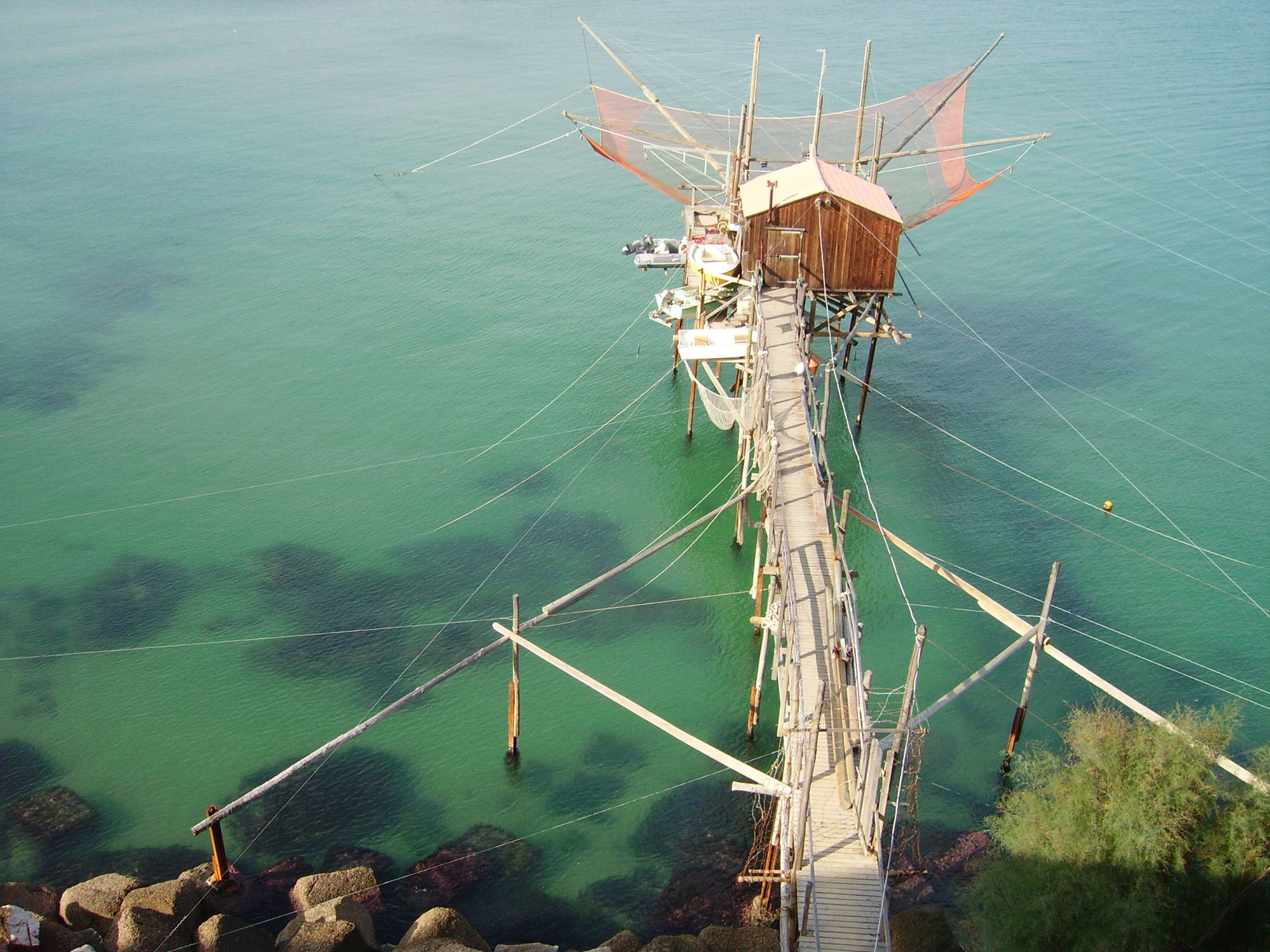
Trabucco from the Village of Termoli

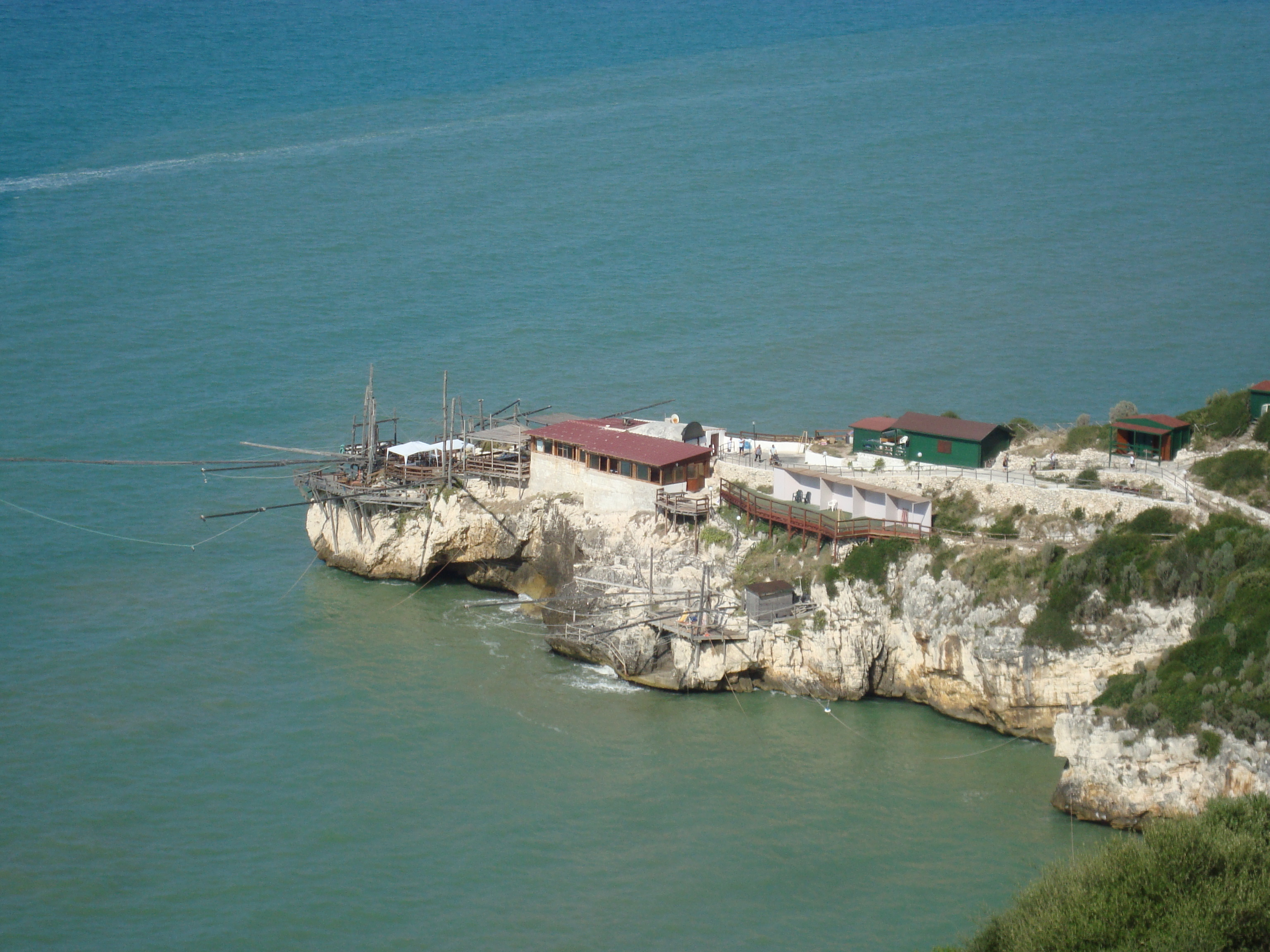
A promontory on the rocky coast of Peschici that has two different sized trabucchi

A trabucco is a wooden fishing installation consisting of a seaward-jutting platform anchored to coastal rock by robust tree trunks of Aleppo pine. Two or more cantilevered beams, known as antenne, extend from this platform a few meters above the water and support a large, tight-meshed net called a trabocchetto.

The differing coastal morphology of the Gargano Peninsula versus farther south has given rise to two distinct variants. The Gargano type is fixed to a rocky spur and aligned longitudinally with the shoreline, with the antenne projecting seawards. The version seen in Abruzzo and Molise, technically termed bilancia, is usually built on shallower beaches: its platform lies transverse to the coast and is linked to land by a narrow wooden gangway. Abruzzese installations typically employ a single winch—often motor-driven even in calm conditions—and carry a smaller net than their Gargano counterparts. They also differ in the length and number of antenne: bilancie in Termoli rarely exceed two beams, whereas structures on the Gargano and in northern Apulia (Barletta, Trani, Molfetta) commonly have two or more.

Fishing is conducted a vista (by direct observation), intercepting schools that follow the coastal inlets with the dense lift net. Trabucchi are sited where the water depth reaches at least six meters, frequently on rocky promontories oriented south-east or north-west to take advantage of prevailing currents.

The net is lowered and raised by a system of winches operated by two people, while a typical crew of four—known as traboccanti—shares lookout and maneuvering duties.

== History ==
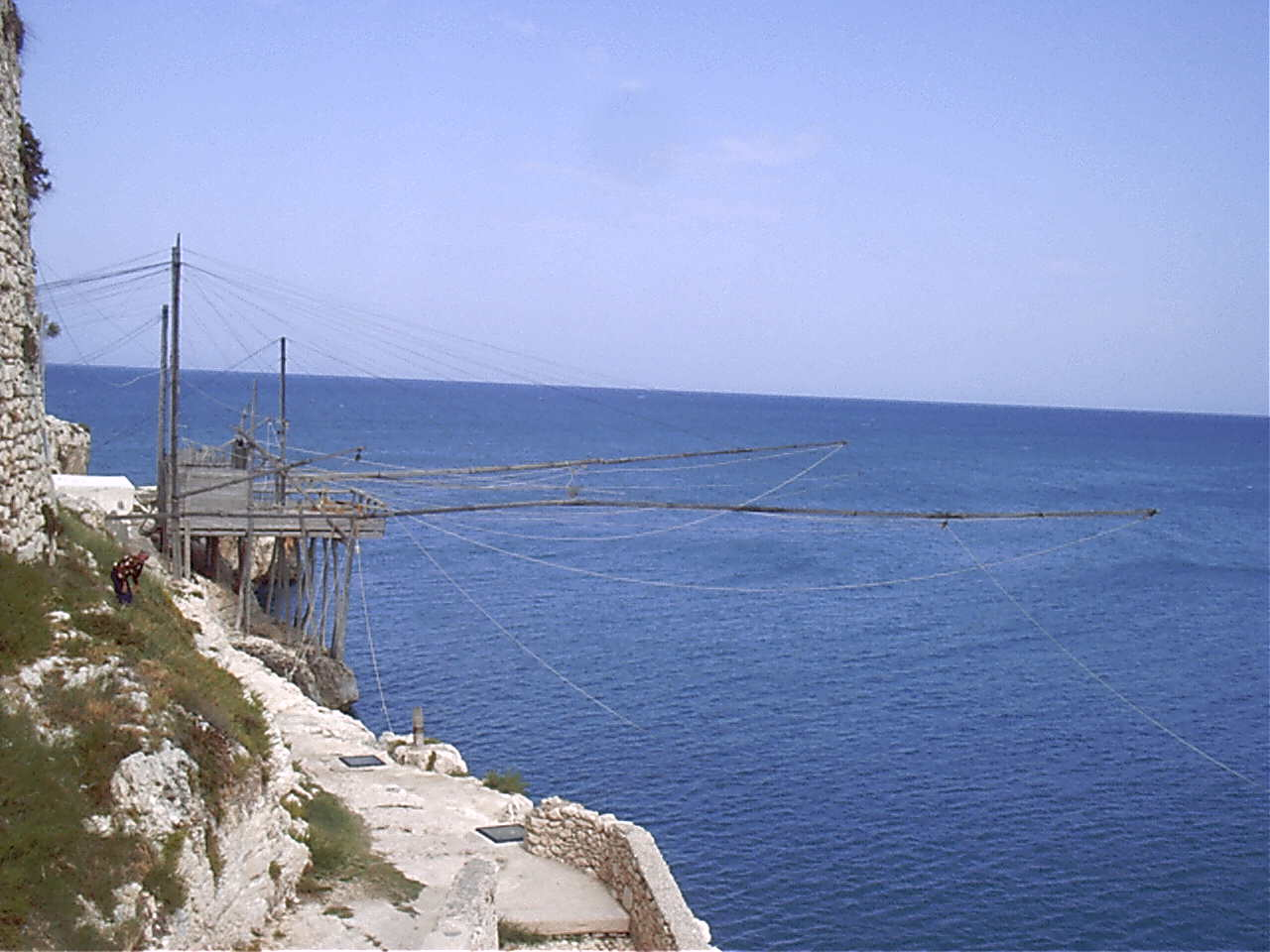
An ancient trabucco of Gargano at Vieste

According to certain Apulian historians, the trabocco may have been introduced by the Phoenicians. The earliest documented evidence in Gargano dates to the 18th century, when inhabitants of southern coastal Abruzzo devised an ingenious technique of fishing that wasn't subject to weather conditions in the area: trabocchi were erected on the most prominent points of headlands and promontories, casting their nets offshore by means of timber arms.

Traditionally, trabucchi are built from Aleppo pine, a species common in Gargano and throughout the central Adriatic that is easy to work, weatherproof, and resistant to salt, important since trabucchi must resist the strong local winds of Provence. From the second half of the 20th century their role in subsistence and commercial fishing has steadily diminished, reflecting changing regional economic conditions. Some trabucchi have been rebuilt in recent years, thanks to public funds, and many have been converted for restaurant use, often while still retaining their original fishing function.

== Fishing system ==
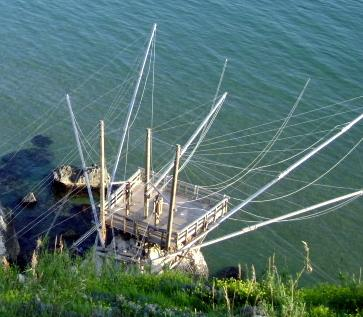
Trabucco of Rodi Garganico

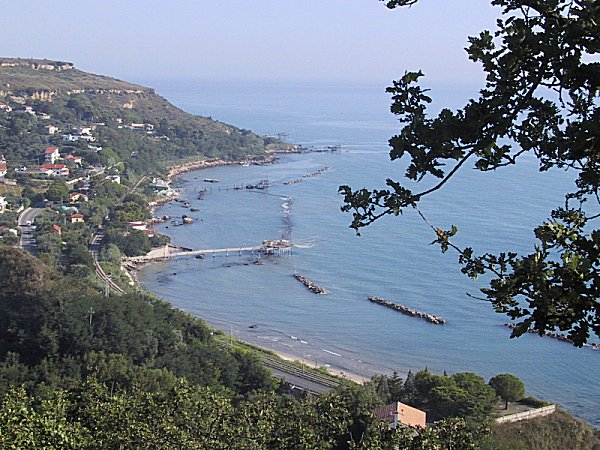
Trabocchi along the coast of Chieti, given by Abbey of San Giovanni in Venere to Fossacesia.

The fishing technique, quite efficacious, is on sight. It consists of intercepting, with wide nets, the flows of fish moving along the ravines of the coast. Trabucchi are located where the sea is deep enough (at least 6 meters), and are built on rocky peaks generally oriented southeast or north in order to exploit the favorable marine current.

The net is lowered into the water through a complex system of winches and, likewise, promptly pulled up to retrieve its catch. At least two men are entrusted with the tough task of operating the winches that maneuver the giant net. The small trabucchi of Abruzzo and Molise Coast are often electrically powered.

The trabucco is managed at least by four fishermen called trabuccolanti who share the duties of watching the fish and maneuvering.

== Distribution ==
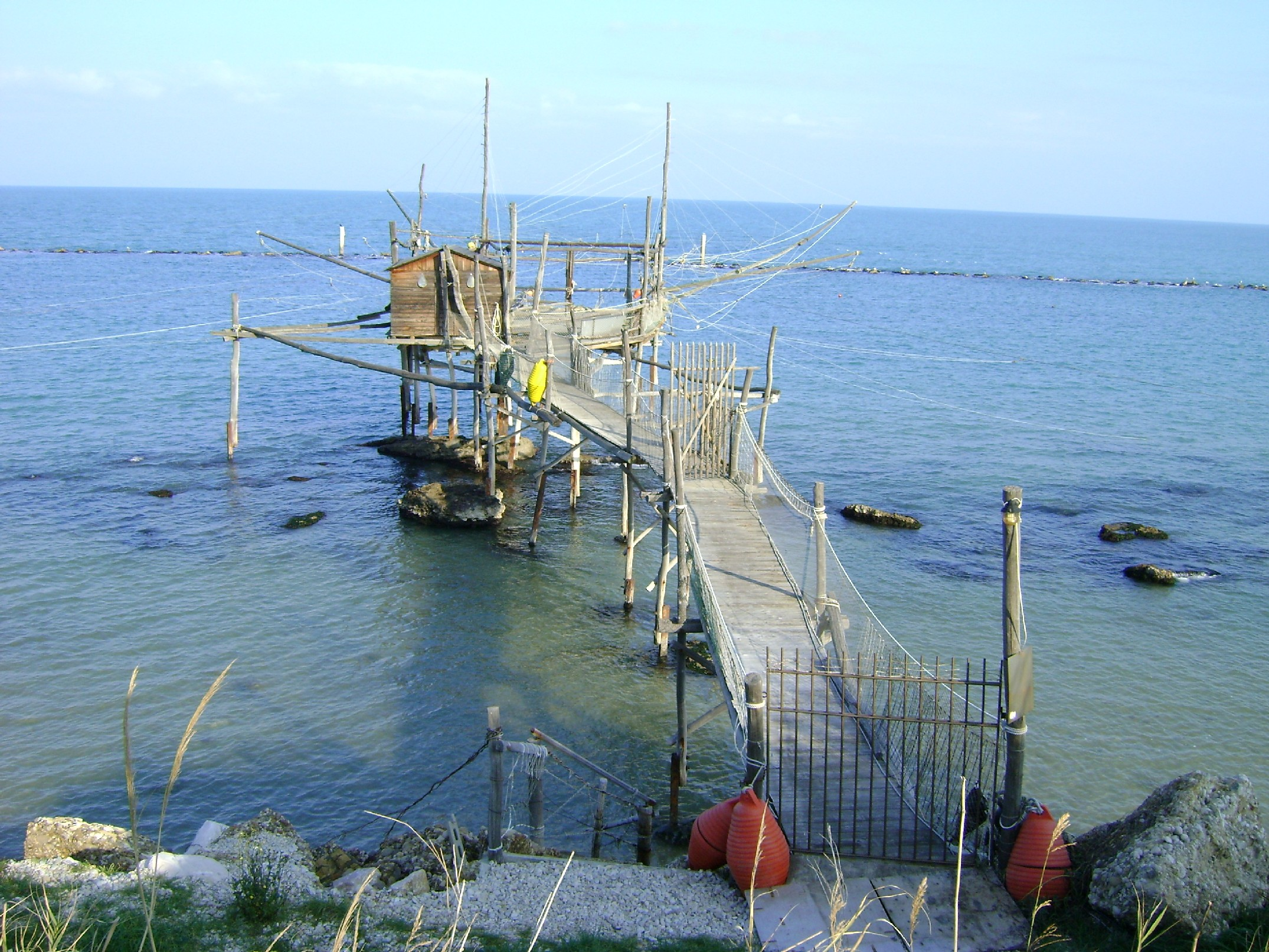
Trabucco in Fossacesia

Trabucchi are a distinctive feature of the coastal landscape of the lower Adriatic, though examples are also seen along the southern Tyrrhenian Sea.

Trabucchi are spread throughout the Trabocchi Coast in the Abruzzo region, where they are called travocchi (dialect of Molise and Abruzzo) in the province of Campobasso, Termoli, Chieti and south of Ortona and in the Gargano coast. They are also common between Peschici and Vieste, where most promontories feature a trabucco. The ancient trabucchi are protected by the National Park of Gargano, which adopted them for their traditional and environmental significance. They are a favorite subject of artists and craftsmen.

== Costa dei Trabocchi ==
The Trabocchi Coast (Costa dei Trabocchi) is a stretch of coastal province of Chieti, which includes the towns situated between Francavilla al Mare and Vasto. Some of these structures have been converted into restaurants.

== See also ==
- Chinese fishing nets

Trabucco's area of diffusion

- Gargano
- Peschici
- Rodi Garganico
- San Menaio
- Vico del Gargano
- Vieste

Area of diffusion of trabocco or bilancia variants

- Ortona
- San Vito Chietino
- Termoli
- Vasto
