= San Vito Chietino =

- Comune
- Comune di San Vito Chietino
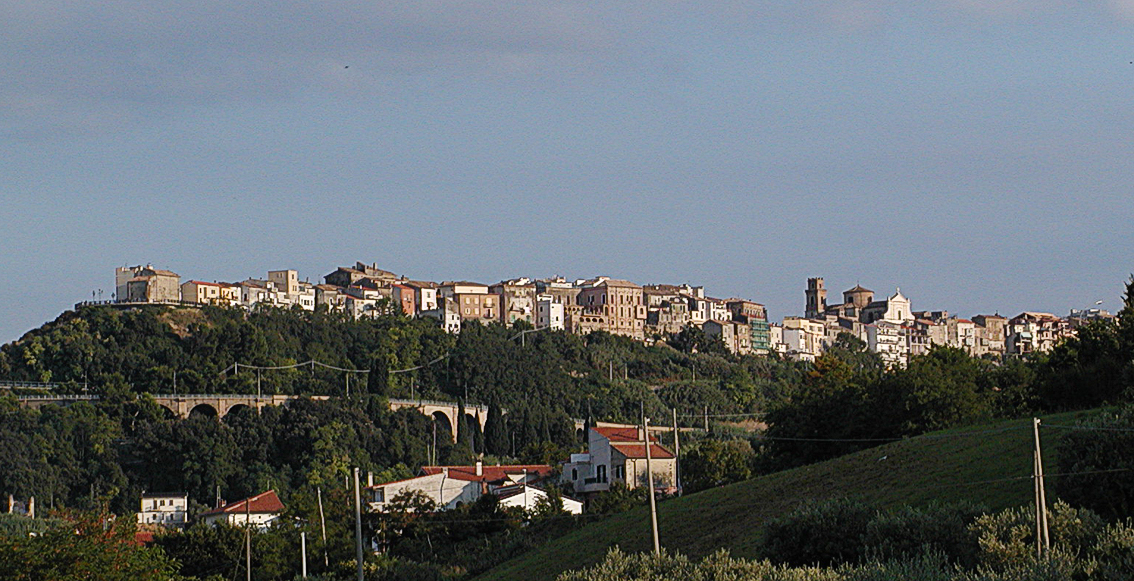
- Panorama of San Vito Chietino in 2007

- Coat of arms

- Location within Italy Location within Abruzzo
- Coordinates: 42°18′N 14°27′E
- Country: Italy
- Region: Abruzzo
- Province: Chieti (CH)
- Frazioni: Anticaglia, Balsamate, Bufara, Castellana, Cese, Cintioni, Colle Capuano, Foresta, Mancini, Melogranato, Murata Alta, Murata Bassa, Paolini, Passo Tucci, Pontoni, Portelle, Quercia del Corvo, Rapanice, Renazzo, San Fino, San Rocco Vecchio, Sant'Apollinare, Sciutico, Strutte, Valle Ienno, Vicende

Government
  - Mayor: Rocco Catenaro

Area
  - Total: 16 km^{2} (6.2 sq mi)
- Elevation: 122 m (400 ft)

Population (31 December 2009)
  - Total: 5,326
  - Density: 330/km^{2} (860/sq mi)
- Demonym: Sanvitesi
- Time zone: UTC+1 (CET)
  - Summer (DST): UTC+2 (CEST)
- Postal code: 66038
- Dialing code: 0872
- Patron saint: St. Vitus
- Saint day: 15 June
- Website: Official website

San Vito Chietino is a town and comune in the province of Chieti in the Abruzzo region of central Italy.

== Geography ==
The town is bordered by Frisa, Lanciano, Ortona, Rocca San Giovanni, Treglio and Fossacesia.

== Economy ==
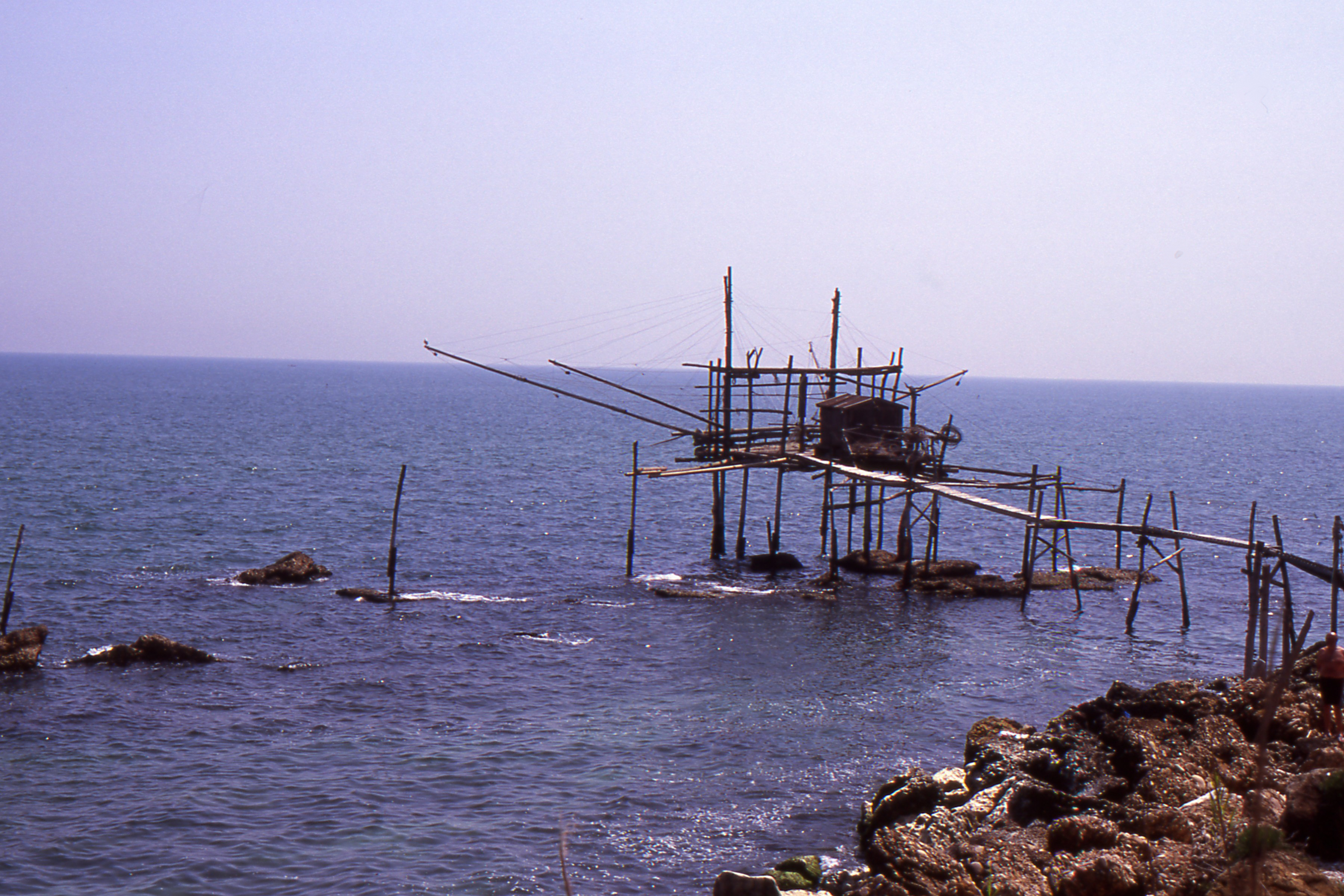
Trabucco of San Vito

The town is known for its trabocchi, large wooden platforms that were traditionally used for fishing on the southern coast of Abruzzo. Tourism has grown in recent decades.

== Notable residents ==
- Gabriele D'Annunzio, poet, lived in the town in 1900.
- Stanislao Gastaldon (1861–1939), the composer of "Musica Proibita", spent his early childhood in San Vito Chietino.
