= D'Orsogna =

D'Orsogna is an Italian surname. Notable people with the surname include:

- Maria Rita D'Orsogna (born 1972), Italian and American applied mathematician and environmental activist
- Tommaso D'Orsogna (born 1990), Australian swimmer

== See also ==
- D'Orsogna Cup, Australian soccer competition
- D'Orsogna Family Roma Cup, Australian horse race
