= Costa Giardino =

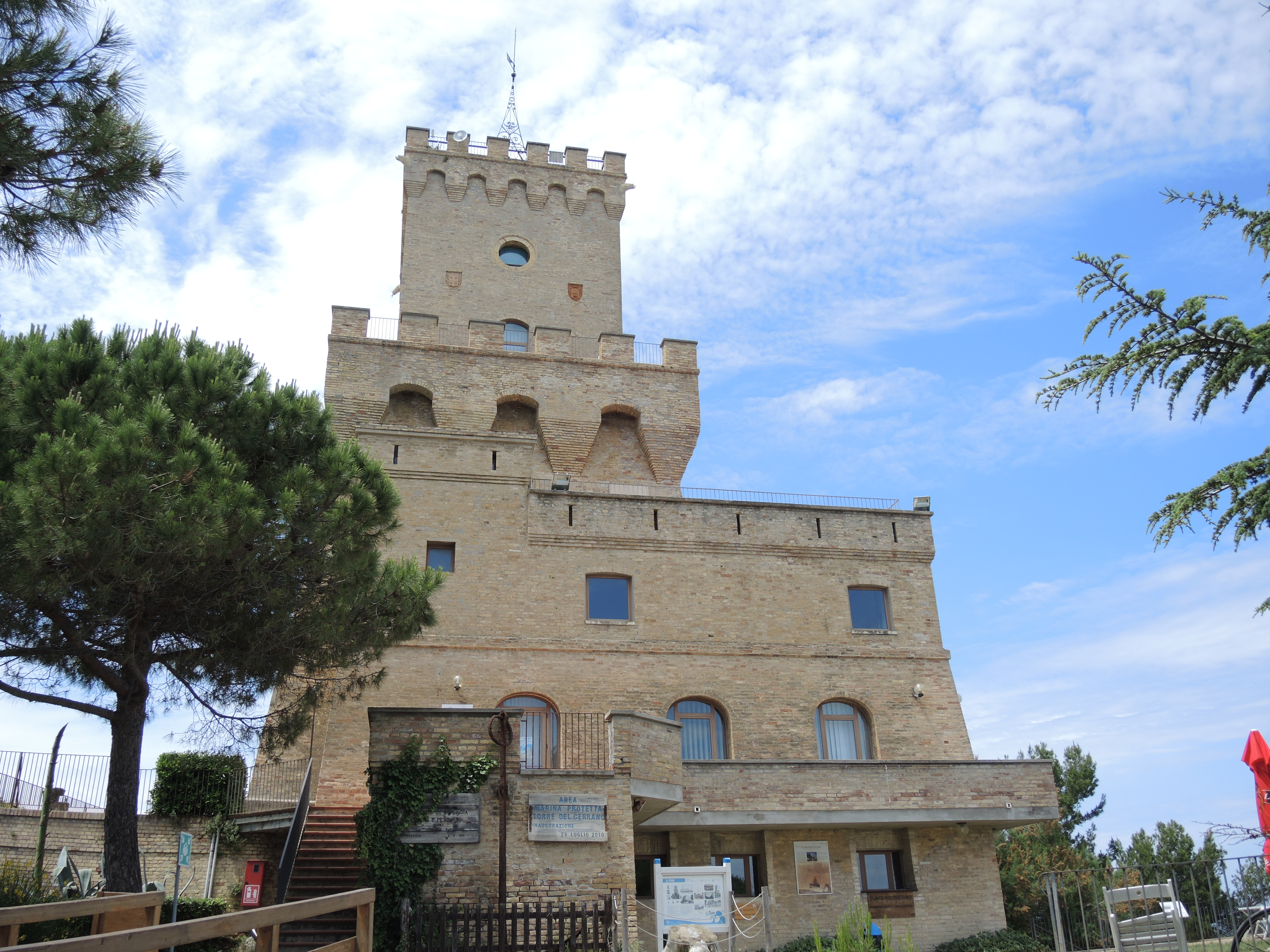
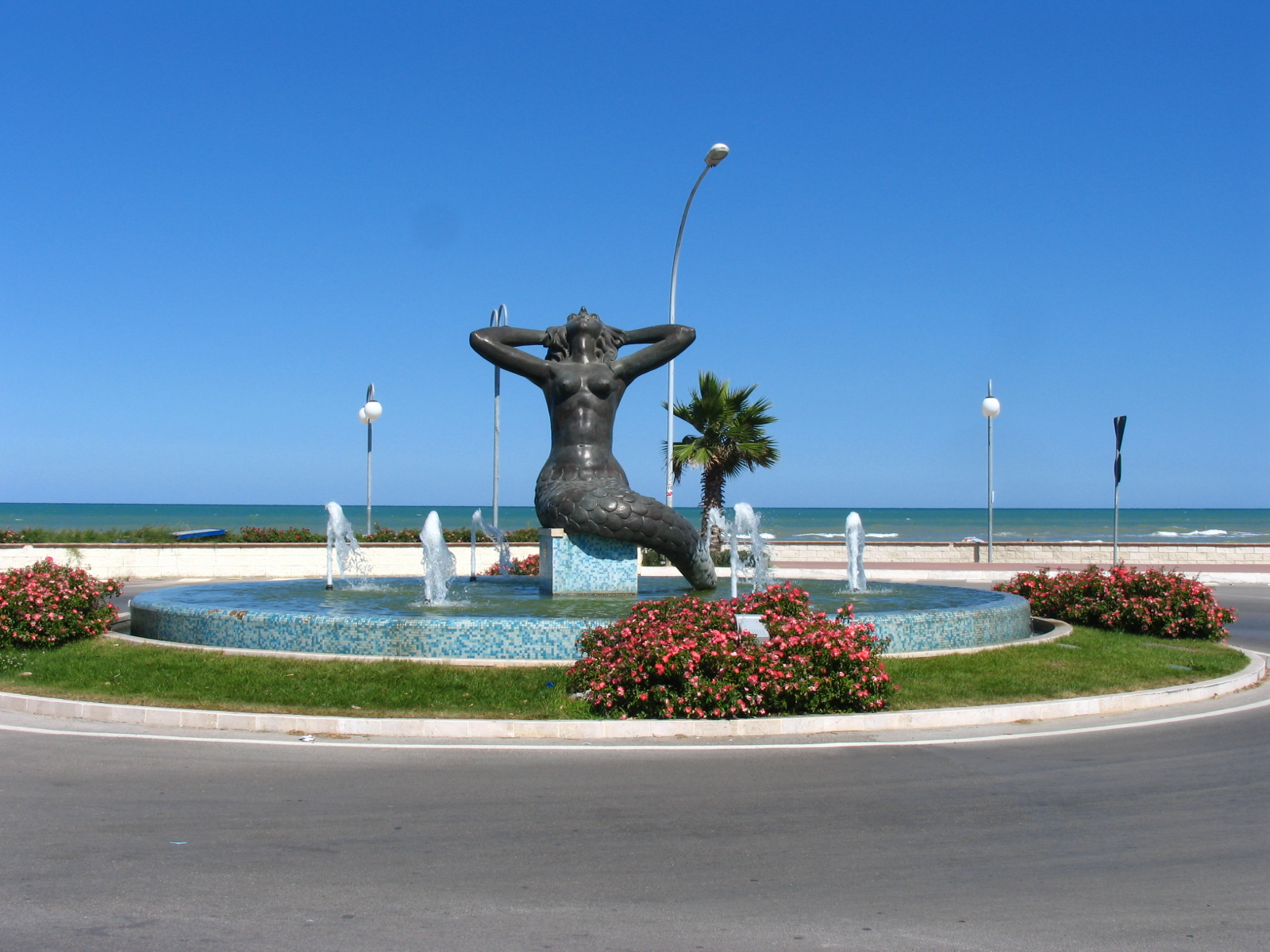
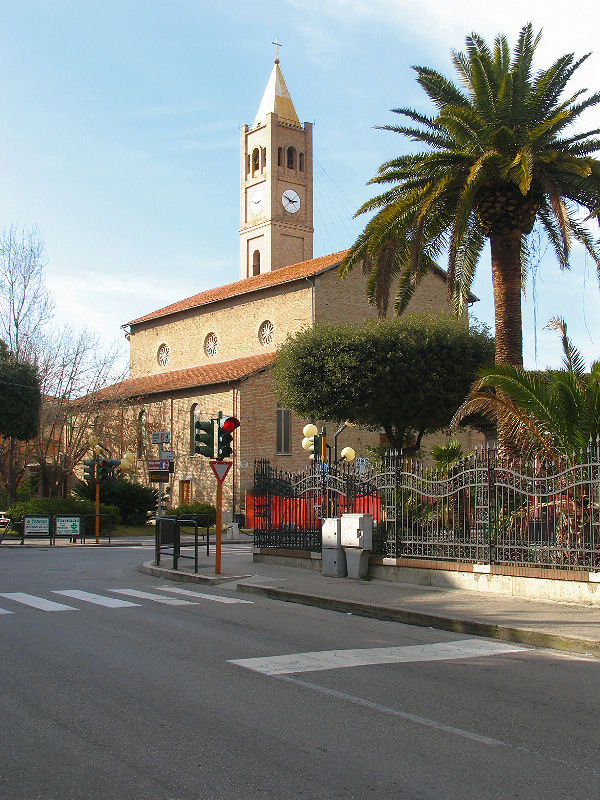
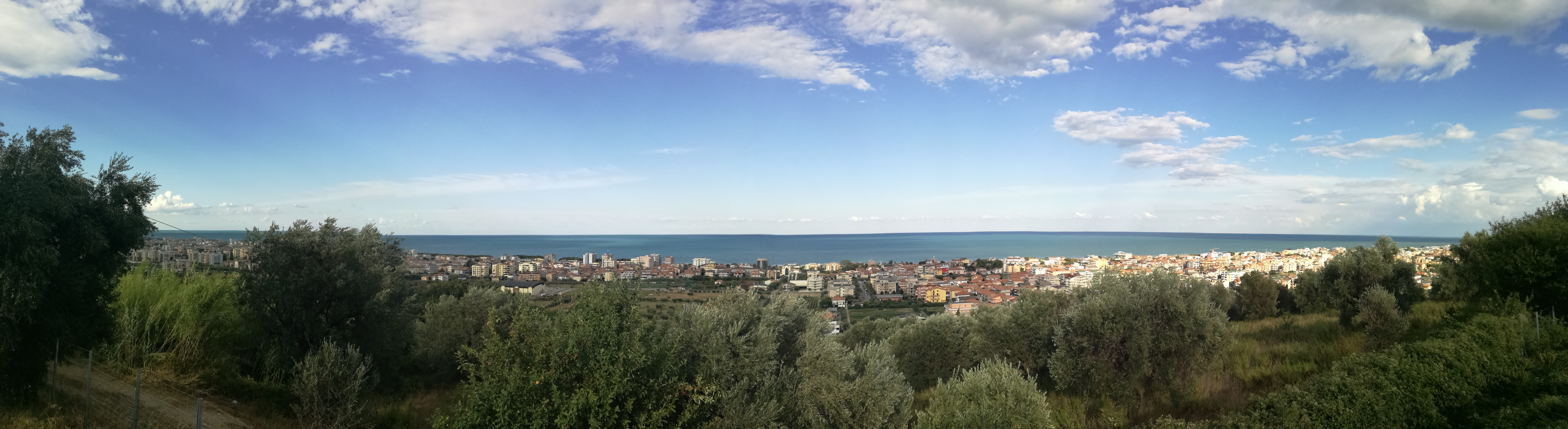
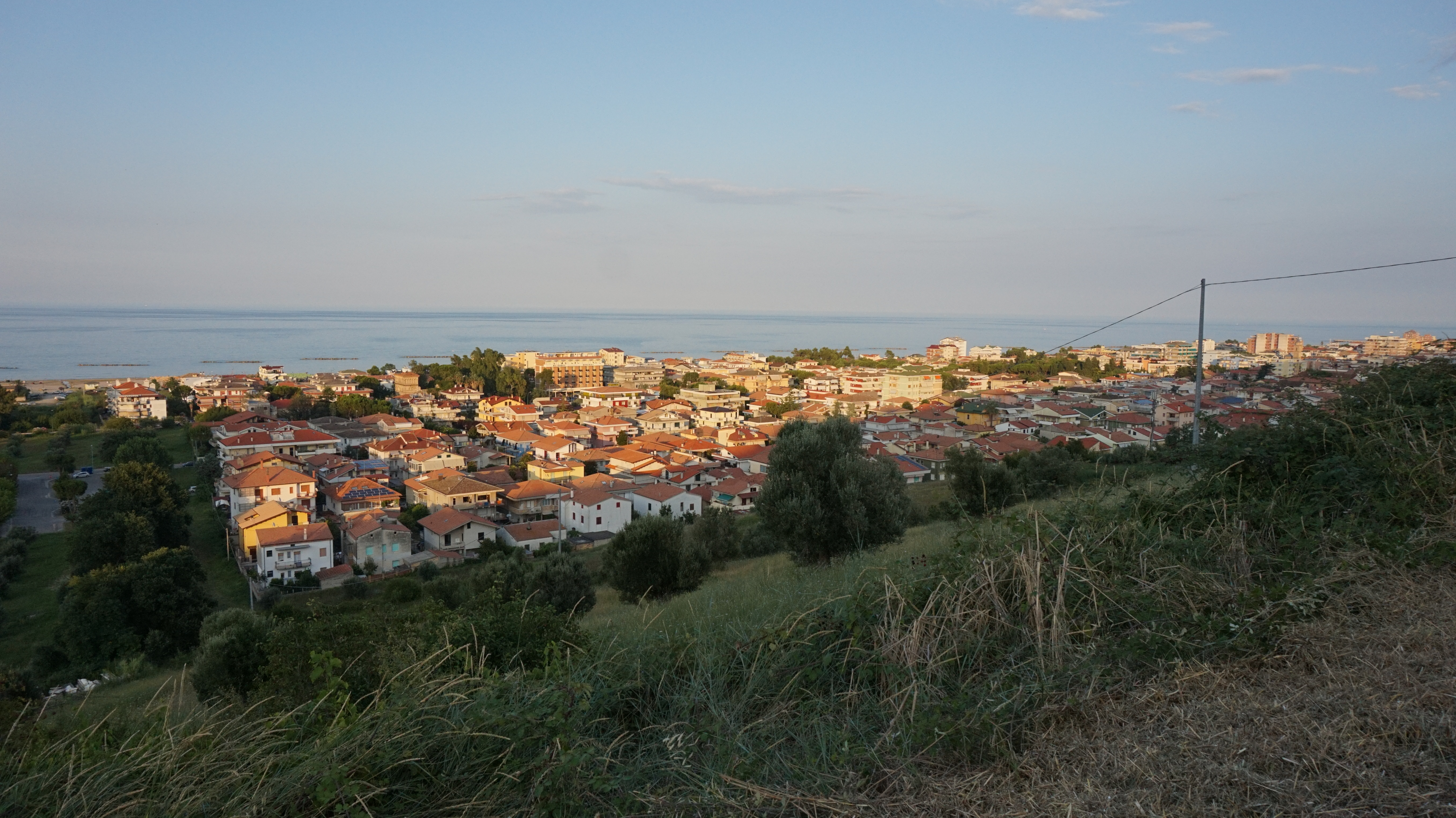
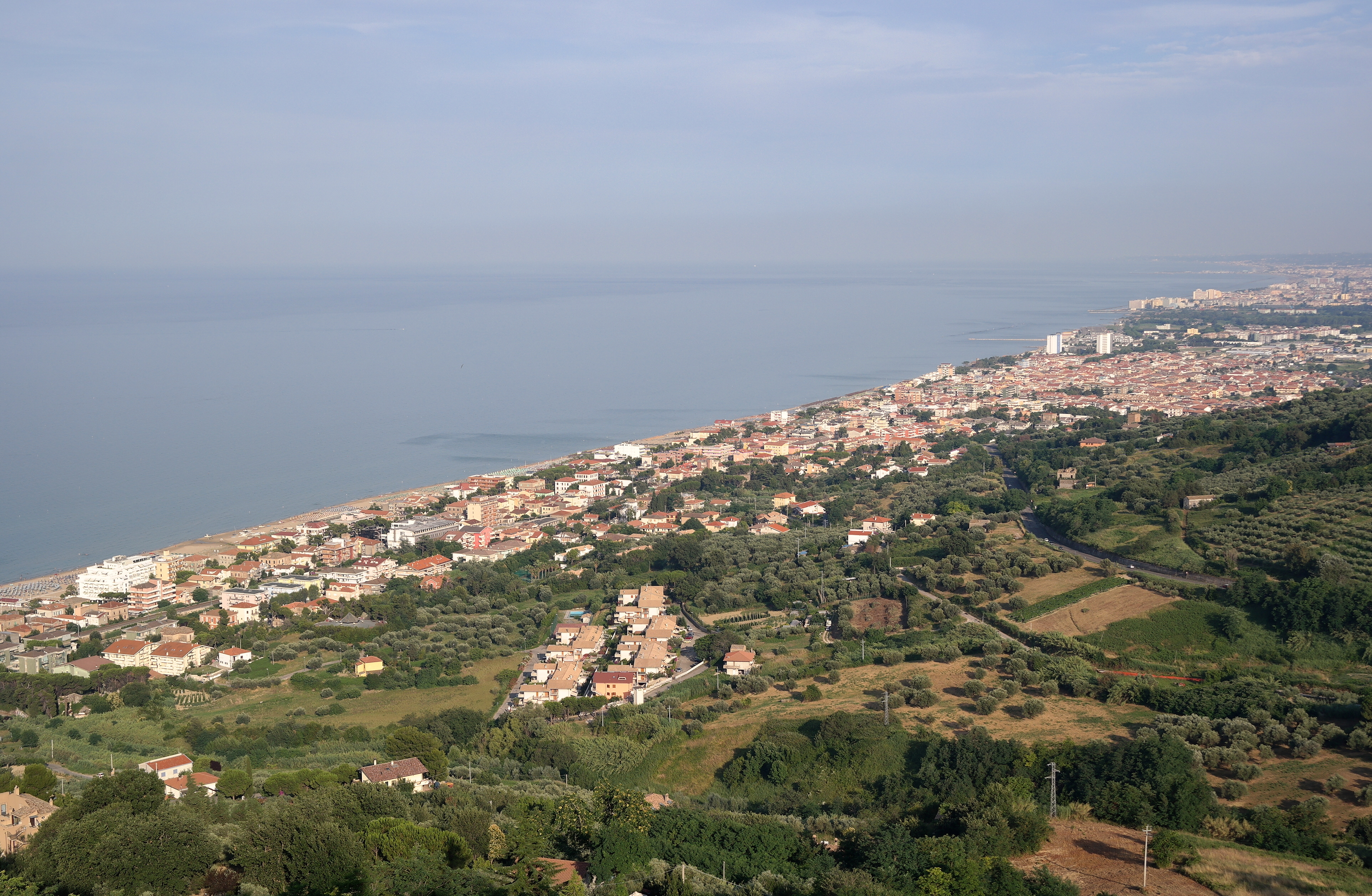
- Interactive map of Costa Giardino
- Coordinates: 42°45′N 13°57′E
- Country: Italy
- Regione: Abruzzo
- Province: Teramo

The Costa Giardino, which corresponds to the coastal stretch Adriatic of province of Teramo (Abruzzo), is a 44-kilometre coast from Martinsicuro to Silvi, in Italy, located north-east of the Abruzzo coast.

== Geology ==
The Costa Giardíno has very wide beaches, sandy and shallow seabeds with gentle slopes, ideal for beach tourism. Presence of dense pinares costeros (typical of the Mediterranean matorral) and of the Torre del Cerrano Marine Protected Area located between Pineto and Silvi.

== Municipalities ==
The municipalities that compose it are part of the province of Teramo and are as follows:

- Martinsicuro
- Alba Adriatica
- Tortoreto
- Giulianova
- Roseto degli Abruzzi
- Pineto
- Silvi

This centers they are nicknamed the seven sisters.

== Economy ==
Tourism is highly developed, especially seaside tourism and cycle tourism with the Ciclovia Adriatica which runs along the Adriatic coast, also passing through the towns of the Costa Giardino. Of particular naturalistic interest is the Torre del Cerrano marine protected area which preserves several very rare botanical species.

== Blue Flag ==
Due to the quality of its water, the Costa Giardino is one of the most ones of Italian Adriatic Coast, by the Blue Flag beaches.

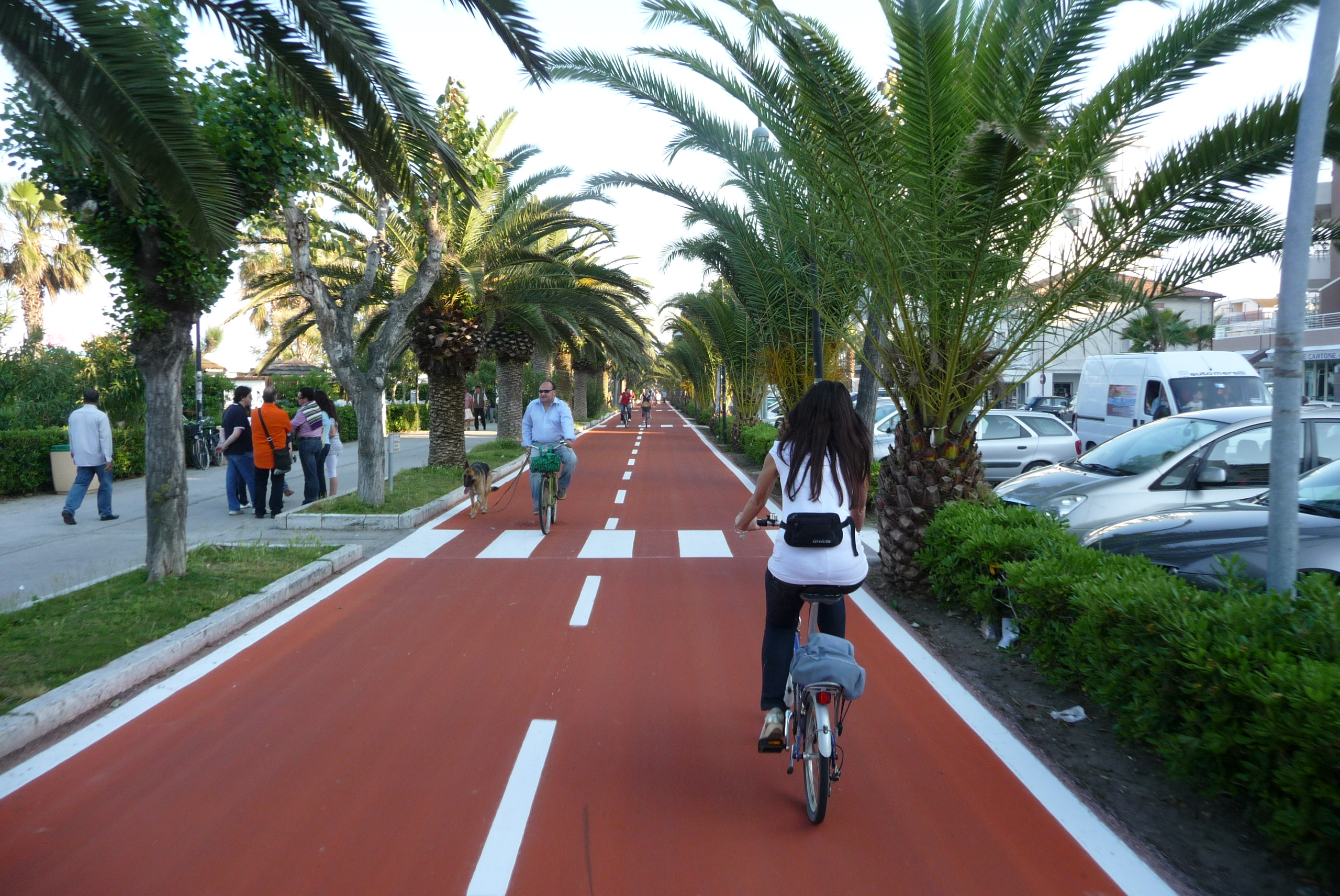
Cicle track, Alba Adriatica (Teramo)

== See also ==
- Economy of Abruzzo
- Cuisine of Abruzzo
- Tourism in Italy
- Tourism in Abruzzo
- Trabocchi Coast
