= San Giovanni in Venere Abbey =

Religious building in Fossacesia, Italy

Coordinates: 42°15′18″N 14°29′55″E

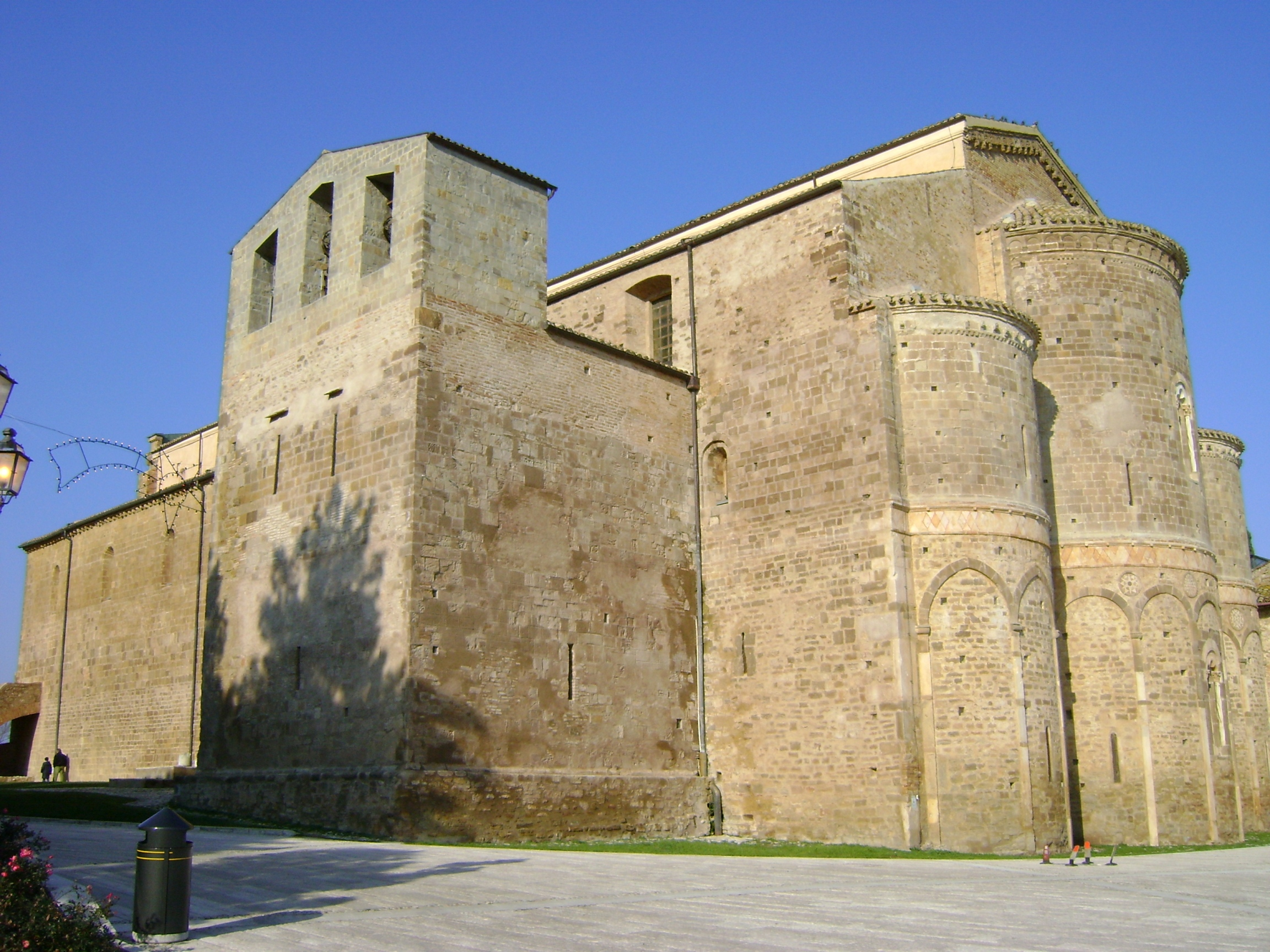
Outer view of the apse and the bell tower.

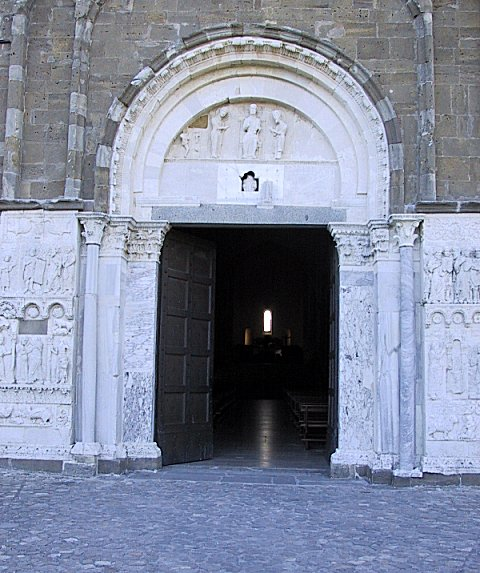
Main entrance of the abbey.

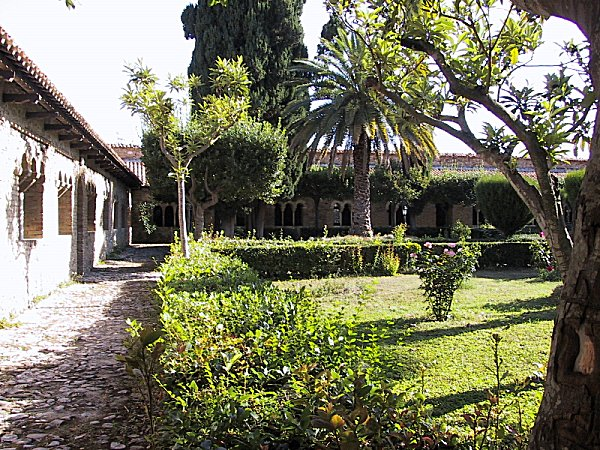
Cloister.

The Abbey of San Giovanni in Venere (Italian: "Abbey of St. John in Venus") is a monastery complex in the comune of Fossacesia, in Abruzzo, central Italy. it is located on a hill facing the Adriatic Sea, at 107 m over the sea level.

It includes a basilica and the monastery proper, both built in the early 13th century on a pre-existing convent.

== History ==
The reference to Venus derives from the traditional presence of a temple of the goddess in the site, which would have been built in 80 BC. Portus Veneris was the name of a Byzantine landing place at the mouth of the Sangro river (the Byzantines controlled parts of southern Italy until the 11th century).

Again according to tradition, the origins of the monastery were connected to a small cellarius (small recovery) for Benedictine monks, with a chapel, built by one Martin around 540 AD by demolishing the temple. Recent excavations have shown the presence of an early construction and of tombs dating from the 6th-7th centuries. The first document mentioning Sancti Johannes in foce de fluvio Sangro (Saint John's near the mouth of Sangro river) dates from 829.

The monastery expanded around the year 1000. Thrasimund I and Thrasimund II, Counts of Chieti, had the cellarius enlarged into an abbey depending from Monte Cassino, and made extensive donations to it. In 1043 the abbey was placed under imperial protection. Around 1060, abbot Oderisius I, fearing an advance of the Normans towards Chieti, fortified the monastery and founded the castrum (castle) of Rocca San Giovanni.

In the 12th century the abbey reached the climax of its splendour. In 1165 abbot Oderisius II had a new church built and the monastery further enlarged. While the former, apart sculptures and canvasses, is still the same, the latter is today only a small fraction of the edifice: in the year 1200 it housed 80-120 Benedictines monks, it has several studios, laboratories, a large library and a rich archive (whose texts are now in Rome), two cloisters, a bakery, an ambulatory, stables a recovery for pilgrims and much other features.

Saint Berardo retired in the abbey in the 12th century. In that period the abbot was the most powerful feudatory of the Kingdom of Sicily, possessing much of today's provinces of Chieti and Pescara, and other lands from Ravenna to Benevento. He could provide 95 knights and 126 infantry in case of war. The abbot was a nullius diocesis, its abbot acting as bishop.

The abbey started to decline from the 14th century, when it was forced to sell much of its territories. In 1394 the Roman Curia subjected it to commendatory abbots, named by the Pope. In 1585 Pope Sixtus V gave the abbey and what remained of its fief to the Oratory of St. Philip Neri. In 1871 the new-born Kingdom of Italy confiscated the monastery and its asset.

Ten years later the abbey was declared national monument and assigned to the same Philippines monks. After another period of decay, and a series of damages during World War II, the abbey is now cared by a community of Passionists. The church and what remains of the monastery was restored starting from the 1950s.

== Church ==
The church has the typical structure of the Cistercian basilicas, with a nave and two aisles separated by ogival arches and wooden ceiling. The main façade is characterized by a large marble portal (called Portale della Luna, "Moon portal"), decorated with high-reliefs and other re-used material. On the southern side are the Portale delle Donne ("Women's Portal"), also with marble decorations, and the bell tower, which is now shorter than originally and which was also used as a defensive structure. Opposite to the façade are three apses, with arcade decorations and mullioned windows of Arabic influence.

In the interior, the apses are decorated with 13th-century frescoes. Under the high altar is the crypt, with Roman columns. Under the main entrance is another room, which was carved out in the 13th century from the apse of the Palaeo-Christian structure.

== Monastery ==
Traces of the Middle Ages monastery remain in the current convent. The old edifice was a rectangular structure on four levels, with raised access, which was renovated in Renaissance times. Abbot Oderisius II had the cloister built in the 13th century: the one visible today is mostly a 20th-century restoration. The cloister opened on three sides in the residential and working complex.

== Sources ==
- Mayer, E. (1952). Badia di San Giovanni in Venere. Lanciano: Fossacesia.
