= Joseph Rudnick =

American physicist

Joseph Alan Rudnick (born 1944) is an American physicist and professor in the Department of Physics and Astronomy at UCLA. Rudnick currently serves as the senior dean of the UCLA College of Letters and Science and dean of the Division of Physical Sciences. He previously served as the chair of the Department of Physics and Astronomy. His research interests include condensed-matter physics, statistical mechanics, and biological physics.
