= Casalbordino =

- Comune
- Comune di Casalbordino
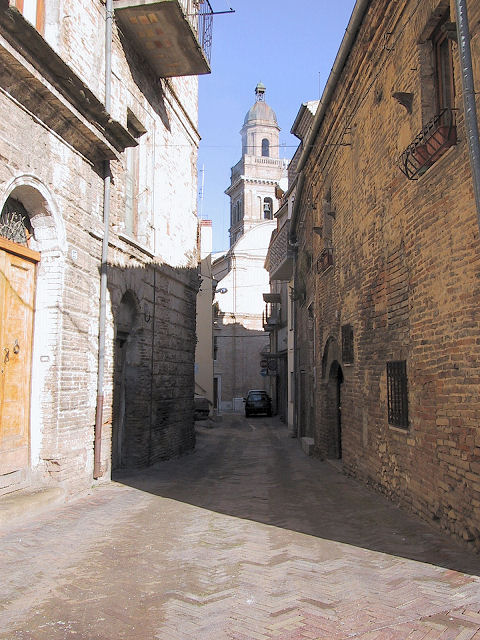

- Coat of arms

- Location within Italy Location within Abruzzo
- Coordinates: 42°9′N 14°35′E
- Country: Italy
- Region: Abruzzo
- Province: Chieti (CH)
- Frazioni: Casalbordino Lido, Cerreto, Leoni, Miracoli, Piana D'Alloro, Piana Sabella, Ripa, Verdugia, Vidorni

Government
  - Mayor: Commissar, since 2010

Area
  - Total: 45.90 km^{2} (17.72 sq mi)
- Elevation: 203 m (666 ft)

Population (January 1, 2020 estimate)
  - Total: 5,972
  - Density: 130.1/km^{2} (337.0/sq mi)
- Demonym: Casalesi
- Time zone: UTC+1 (CET)
  - Summer (DST): UTC+2 (CEST)
- Postal code: 66021
- Dialing code: 0873
- Patron saint: St. Stephen
- Saint day: 26 December
- Website: Casalbordino official website

Casalbordino (Abruzzese: Lù Cuasàlë, Lù Casàlë) is a comune (municipality) and coastal town on the Adriatic Sea, within the Province of Chieti of the Abruzzo region of central-eastern Italy.

The closest airport is Abruzzo Airport, which is 42 miles drive. The town has its own train station, Casalbordino Pollutri. The closest hospital is Ospedale San Pioda Pietrelcin in San Giovanni Rotondo, which is a 10-mile drive.

== Physical geography ==
It is located about 6 km from the Adriatic coast, on a hill bordered by the Osento and Sinello rivers. It has a sand beach of 7.5 km long.

== Origin of the name ==
The name is said to date back to a leader of that period named Roberto Bordinus, who captained the garrison in defense of the monastery. Casal, the farmhouse is a small area of dwellings that guarded the monastery. It was developed from an ancient tower and later became the fortified center.

== Traditions ==
Feast of Our Lady of Miracles, year 2018

Casalbordino is particularly linked to the appearance of the so-called "Madonna dei Miracoli" which took place in 1576 in front of the peasant Alessandro Muzii, who prayed to the Virgin Mary during a storm to avoid destruction of his farm. The pilgrimage and devotion soon crossed the Casalese border, and extended throughout Abruzzo, so much so that at the time of D'Annunzio, the turnout had reached considerable proportions, during the days of 10 and 11 June. The tradition of miracles and graces granted by the Madonna to the sick, the infirm and the unfortunate, is well documented, and still continues today, according to testimonies of graces obtained by the Madonna.

The current festival takes place on the 10th and 11th days: on the first day the statue of the Madonna is carried in triumph from the sanctuary to the village of Casalbordino, after the holy masses, the adoration of the votive icon at the head of the altar, and the recitation of the Rosary, with the blessing of the final statue. The second day takes place with the civil program, which includes fairs, markets and the grand final concert.

== Economy ==
The economy of the place is mainly agricultural (olive trees and vineyards), but since the 19th-century, sacred tourism has been of considerable importance due to the presence of the sanctuary of the Miracles. In recent times, seaside tourism is also flourishing, thanks to the presence of fine sand beaches named Lido di Casalbordino and the proximity of the Punta Aderci guided nature reserve.

In the coastal municipal area, the so-called "hard" ones of Casalbordino are preserved, a protected natural place where the species of the fratino nests, also characteristic is the beach of Santo Stefano locality, on the border with the Osento river. Casalbordino Lido-Termini, on the other hand, is a small village also equipped with a church for the bathing establishments. At Termini there is the Bosco Collerusci nature reserve.
