= Fossacesia =

- Comune
- Città di Fossacesia
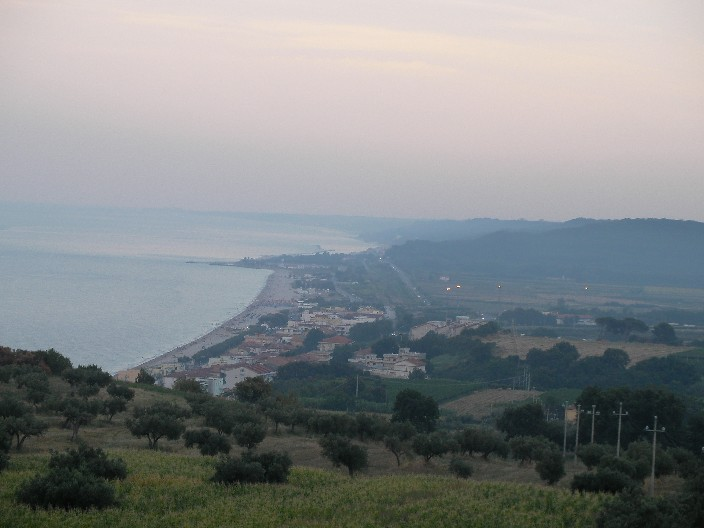

- Coat of arms

- Location within Italy Location within Abruzzo
- Coordinates: 42°15′N 14°29′E
- Country: Italy
- Region: Abruzzo
- Province: Chieti (CH)
- Frazioni: Campidoglio, Colle Cannizza, Colle Castagna, Fossacesia Marina, Sterpari, Strutto, Villa Scorciosa

Government
  - Mayor: Enrico di Giuseppantonio

Area
  - Total: 30 km^{2} (12 sq mi)
- Elevation: 142 m (466 ft)

Population (31 October 2008)
  - Total: 6,184
  - Density: 210/km^{2} (530/sq mi)
- Demonym: Fossacesiani
- Time zone: UTC+1 (CET)
  - Summer (DST): UTC+2 (CEST)
- Postal code: 66022
- Dialing code: 0872
- Patron saint: St. Donatus of Arezzo
- Saint day: August 7
- Website: Official website

Fossacesia is a city in the province of Chieti in the Abruzzo region of Italy.

The town is located on a small hill on the left of the Sangro River's mouth, about 2 kilometres (1 mi) from the Adriatic Sea.

== Architecture ==
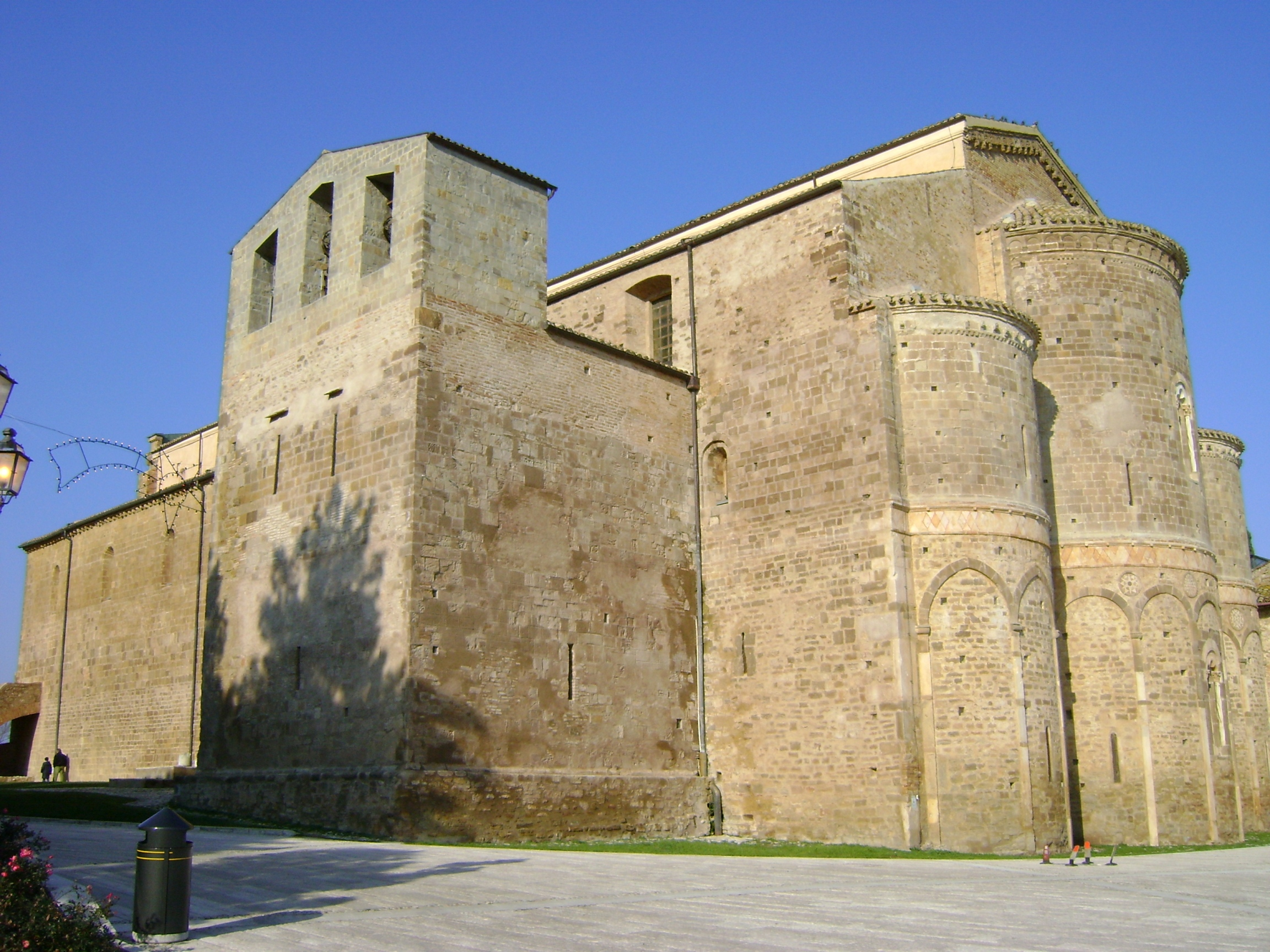
Fossacesia's Abbey

A historic attraction in the town is the Abbey of San Giovanni in Venere.

The town is also home to the Romanesque Period Church of San Silvestro, dating to the 11th century.

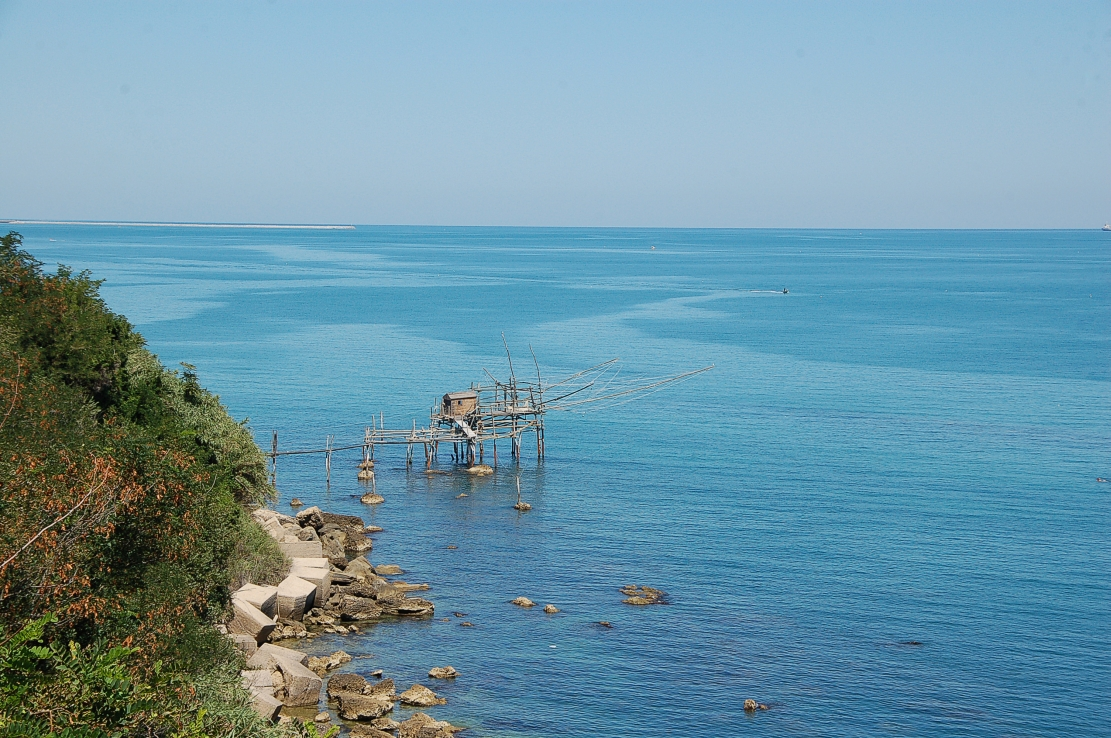
Trabucco of Fossacesia.
