= Ombrina Mare oil field =

Oil field in Southern Apennines, Italy

Ombrina Mare
- Country: Italy
- Region: Southern Apennines
- Location: Southern Apennines
- Offshore/onshore: offshore
- Operator: Mediterranean Oil & Gas
- Partners: Mediterranean Oil & Gas, Eni

Field history
- Discovery: 2007

Production
- Estimated oil in place: 166 million barrels (~2.26×10^{7} t)

The Ombrina Mare oil field is an oil field located off shore Abruzzo. It was discovered in 2007 and developed by Mediterranean Oil & Gas. At the moment the Italian government blocked the projects in the area, since the oil field lies at less than 12 miles from the coastline. The total proven reserves of the Ombrina Mare oil field are around 166 million barrels (29.38 million tonnes), and production is centered on 13,650 barrels per day (2,170 m^{3}/d).

At least one of the companies that had discovered the oil and had concessions to extract it have taken the government of Italy to international arbitration court.
