= Rocca San Giovanni =

- Comune
- Comune di Rocca San Giovanni
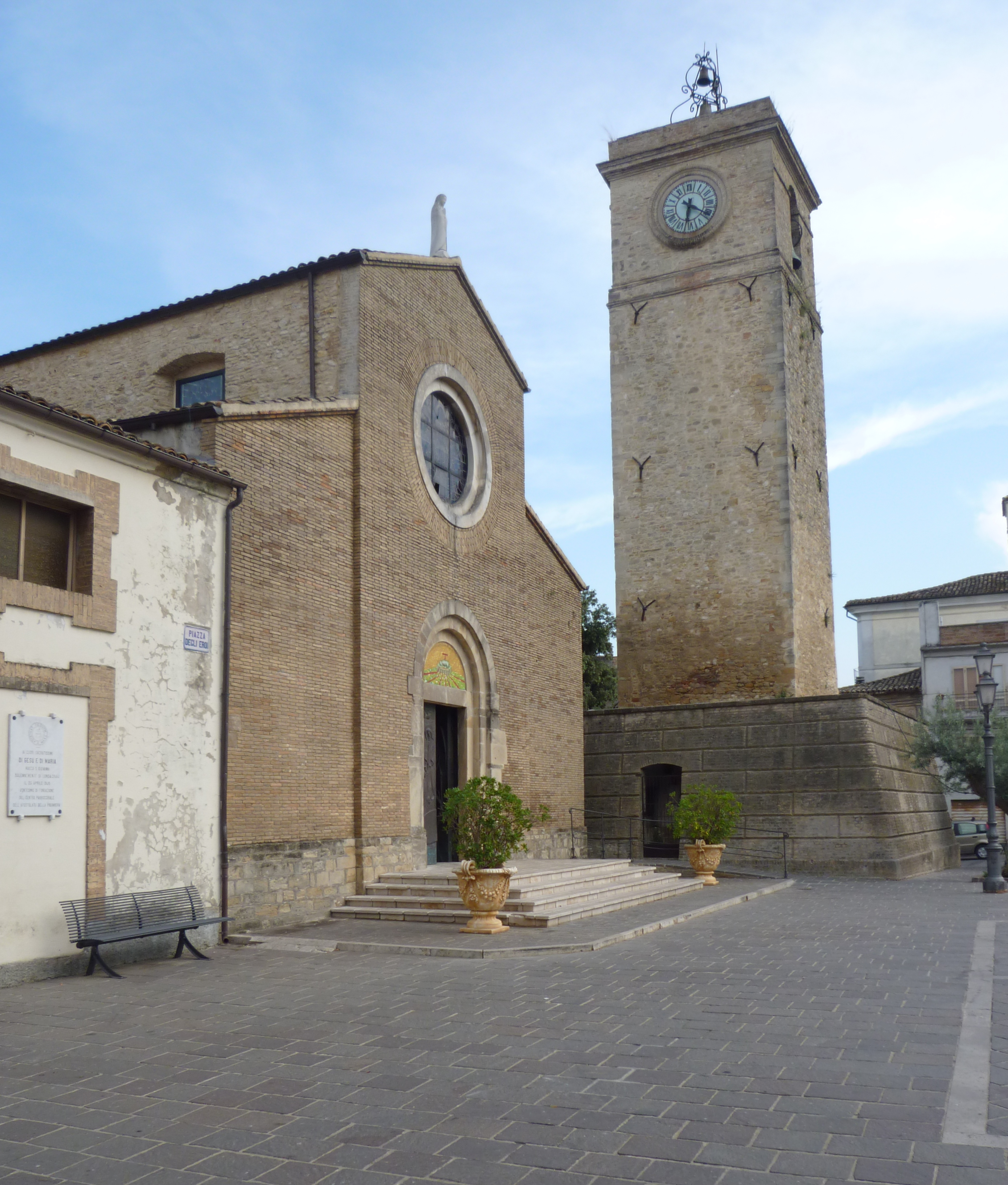
- Church of Saint Matthew

- Coat of arms

- Location within Italy Location within Abruzzo
- Coordinates: 42°15′N 14°28′E
- Country: Italy
- Region: Abruzzo
- Province: Chieti (CH)
- Frazioni: Acquarelli, Foce, Lappeto, Montegranaro, Perazza, Piane di Marche, Piane Favaro, Pocafeccia, Pontone del Signore, Puncichitti, San Giacomo, Santa Calcagna, Tagliaferri, Vallevò, Vetiche

Government
  - Mayor: Fabio Caravaggio

Area
  - Total: 21 km^{2} (8.1 sq mi)
- Elevation: 150 m (490 ft)

Population (2009)
  - Total: 2,342
  - Density: 110/km^{2} (290/sq mi)
- Demonym: Roccolani
- Time zone: UTC+1 (CET)
  - Summer (DST): UTC+2 (CEST)
- Postal code: 66020
- Dialing code: 0872
- Patron saint: St. Matthew
- Saint day: September 21

Rocca San Giovanni is a comune and town in the province of Chieti in the Abruzzo region of Italy. It is one of I Borghi più belli d'Italia ("The most beautiful villages of Italy").

== Main sights ==
The main attraction of the neighbourhood is the Abbey of San Giovanni in Venere. Other sights in Rocca San Giovanni include:

- church of St. Matthew, a medieval structure inspired, in smaller scale, to the Abbey of San Giovanni in Venere. In the 14th-15th centuries a bell tower was added
- remains of the Norman walls, built in 1061
- 14th century historical center

== Twin towns ==
- Chaingy, France
