= List of municipalities of the Province of Chieti =

The following is a list of the 104 municipalities (comuni) of the Province of Chieti in the region of Abruzzo in Italy.

== List ==
Municipality	Population (2026)	Area (km²)	Density
Altino	3,010	15.33	196.3
Archi	1,929	28.54	67.6
Ari	1,071	11.39	94.0
Arielli	1,042	11.72	88.9
Atessa	10,208	110.98	92.0
Bomba	686	17.26	39.7
Borrello	328	14.51	22.6
Bucchianico	4,892	38.08	128.5
Canosa Sannita	1,207	13.91	86.8
Carpineto Sinello	486	29.85	16.3
Carunchio	535	32.56	16.4
Casacanditella	1,172	12.54	93.5
Casalanguida	789	13.67	57.7
Casalbordino	5,591	46.02	121.5
Casalincontrada	2,960	16.00	185.0
Casoli	5,033	67.04	75.1
Castel Frentano	4,181	21.89	191.0
Castelguidone	270	15.07	17.9
Castiglione Messer Marino	1,398	47.99	29.1
Celenza sul Trigno	758	22.68	33.4
Chieti	48,368	59.57	812.0
Civitaluparella	272	22.46	12.1
Civitella Messer Raimondo	738	12.72	58.0
Colledimacine	149	11.30	13.2
Colledimezzo	401	11.05	36.3
Crecchio	2,550	19.23	132.6
Cupello	4,899	48.39	101.2
Dogliola	304	11.85	25.7
Fallo	121	6.10	19.8
Fara Filiorum Petri	1,972	14.96	131.8
Fara San Martino	1,253	44.69	28.0
Filetto	807	13.53	59.6
Fossacesia	6,269	30.14	208.0
Fraine	238	16.09	14.8
Francavilla al Mare	25,521	23.09	1,105.3
Fresagrandinaria	913	25.15	36.3
Frisa	1,594	11.49	138.7
Furci	779	25.99	30.0
Gamberale	267	15.56	17.2
Gessopalena	1,137	31.47	36.1
Gissi	2,401	36.65	65.5
Giuliano Teatino	1,105	9.89	111.7
Guardiagrele	8,161	56.50	144.4
Guilmi	443	12.56	35.3
Lama dei Peligni	1,007	31.37	32.1
Lanciano	33,843	66.94	505.6
Lentella	653	12.62	51.7
Lettopalena	306	21.13	14.5
Liscia	623	8.18	76.2
Miglianico	4,620	22.73	203.3
Montazzoli	790	39.46	20.0
Montebello sul Sangro	80	5.38	14.9
Monteferrante	100	15.29	6.5
Montelapiano	68	8.27	8.2
Montenerodomo	562	30.00	18.7
Monteodorisio	2,314	25.21	91.8
Mozzagrogna	2,422	14.10	171.8
Orsogna	3,595	25.45	141.3
Ortona	21,921	70.88	309.3
Paglieta	4,100	33.78	121.4
Palena	1,196	93.63	12.8
Palmoli	851	32.78	26.0
Palombaro	921	17.19	53.6
Pennadomo	201	11.02	18.2
Pennapiedimonte	365	47.03	7.8
Perano	1,463	6.48	225.8
Pietraferrazzana	126	4.37	28.8
Pizzoferrato	949	30.92	30.7
Poggiofiorito	751	9.95	75.5
Pollutri	2,016	26.17	77.0
Pretoro	859	26.13	32.9
Quadri	672	7.45	90.2
Rapino	1,115	20.30	54.9
Ripa Teatina	3,899	20.16	193.4
Rocca San Giovanni	2,299	21.70	105.9
Roccamontepiano	1,533	18.22	84.1
Roccascalegna	1,011	23.01	43.9
Roccaspinalveti	1,121	33.01	34.0
Roio del Sangro	101	11.81	8.6
Rosello	175	19.23	9.1
San Buono	835	25.27	33.0
San Giovanni Lipioni	139	8.67	16.0
San Giovanni Teatino	14,541	17.73	820.1
San Martino sulla Marrucina	868	7.41	117.1
San Salvo	19,918	19.70	1,011.1
San Vito Chietino	5,058	17.00	297.5
Sant'Eusanio del Sangro	2,224	23.83	93.3
Santa Maria Imbaro	2,022	5.71	354.1
Scerni	2,901	41.26	70.3
Schiavi di Abruzzo	616	45.58	13.5
Taranta Peligna	301	21.90	13.7
Tollo	3,868	14.96	258.6
Torino di Sangro	2,925	32.12	91.1
Tornareccio	1,640	27.53	59.6
Torrebruna	635	23.29	27.3
Torrevecchia Teatina	4,183	14.68	284.9
Torricella Peligna	1,077	36.11	29.8
Treglio	1,721	4.88	352.7
Tufillo	307	21.44	14.3
Vacri	1,471	12.27	119.9
Vasto	40,920	71.35	573.5
Villa Santa Maria	1,072	16.23	66.1
Villalfonsina	855	9.13	93.6
Villamagna	2,126	12.73	167.0

== See also ==
- List of municipalities of Abruzzo
- List of municipalities of Italy
