= Lake Casoli =

Artificial lake in Abruzzo, Italy

Lago Sant'Angelo (Lago di Casoli)
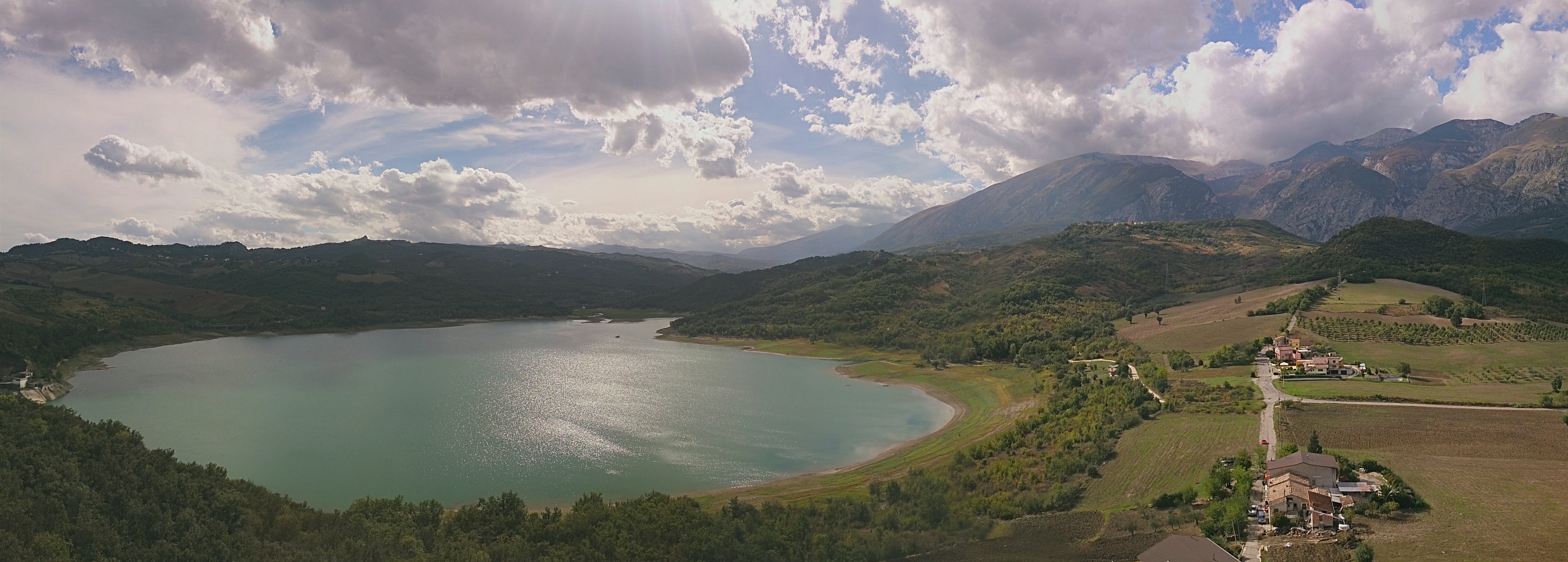
- View of the lake and the Maiella

- Location of Lago Sant'Angelo Lago Sant'Angelo (Lago di Casoli) (Abruzzo)
- Location: Casoli, Province of Chieti, Abruzzo, Italy
- Coordinates: 42°07′36″N 14°17′24″E
- Type: Artificial lake
- Primary inflows: Aventino

The Lago di Casoli, also known as Lago Sant'Angelo, is an artificial basin formed in 1958 by damming the Aventino River to supply the hydroelectric plant Acea in Selva d'Altino.

== Location ==
It is located in the municipality of Casoli, in the Province of Chieti, near the borders with the territories of the municipalities of Gessopalena and Civitella Messer Raimondo.

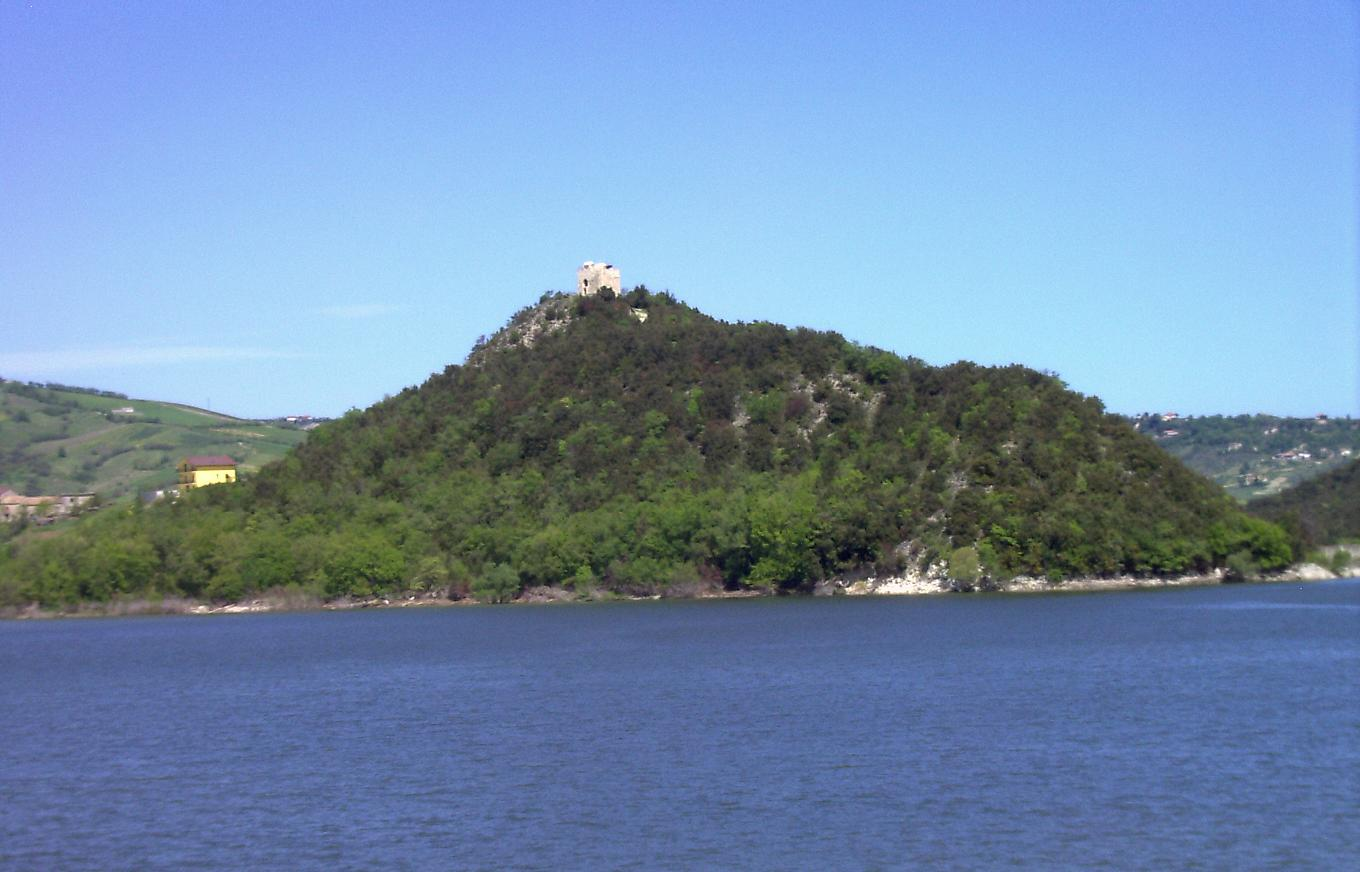
View of the lake hill and the Torretta di Prata

The project began in 1957–58, when ACEA was not yet nationalized; concurrently with the creation of the Lago di Casoli, the Lago di Bomba was built in the Val di Sangro municipality near Casoli, to generate more electricity. The project by engineer Molinas, since electricity was of minimal interest to the small lowland and mountain municipalities of the province of Chieti, was well received by the inhabitants, also because the construction of the dam would provide work for dozens of people. The hydroelectric plant is located in the Sant'Angelo district, between Selva d'Altino and Altino village; hence, the name of the plant, "S. Angelo," has often replaced that of Casoli, to which the lake territory belongs.

Due to the porosity of the soil, thousands of tons of cement were injected for the construction of the hydroelectric plant, so much so that some residue was found in the municipal territory of Villa Santa Maria, 20 km away. When the Roman electricity company was institutionalized in 1962, the Casoli dam project immediately became obsolete; moreover, it had altered the normal autumn-winter-spring climate cycles, causing a warming of the territorial area between Gessopalena, Civitella Messer Raimondo, Casoli, Altino, and Palombaro. Since then, the lake's resource has become primarily touristic, still frequented today by groups in the natural area.

== Flora and fauna ==
Although of artificial origin, today it constitutes an interesting habitat for flora (lesser bulrush) and fauna (Great crested grebe, kingfisher, mallard, coot, moorhen, dipper, yellow wagtail, heron, stork, and cormorant).

== Nature ==
Its location is very suggestive, surrounded as it is by a large holm oak forest (the Site of Community Importance Lecceta di Casoli e bosco di Colle Foreste), punctuated by the Torre di Prata (the so-called Torretta) and with the backdrop of the eastern slope of the Maiella.

== Torretta ==
Above the hill overlooking the lake stands a tower. In the 10th century, documents attest to a castellum de Prata, owned by Trasmondo, Count of Chieti, who granted lands to the Basilican monks Ilarione, Nicola Greco, Falco, and Orante, so they could build a small abbatial cell. The cell was never a true abbey. In the unitary period, the tower was a hideout for brigands.

The tower exhibits the typical appearance of an isolated keep on the hill. The structure is square, made of river stone, with openings for guard outposts.
