= Lago di Bomba =

Lake in Abruzzo, Italy

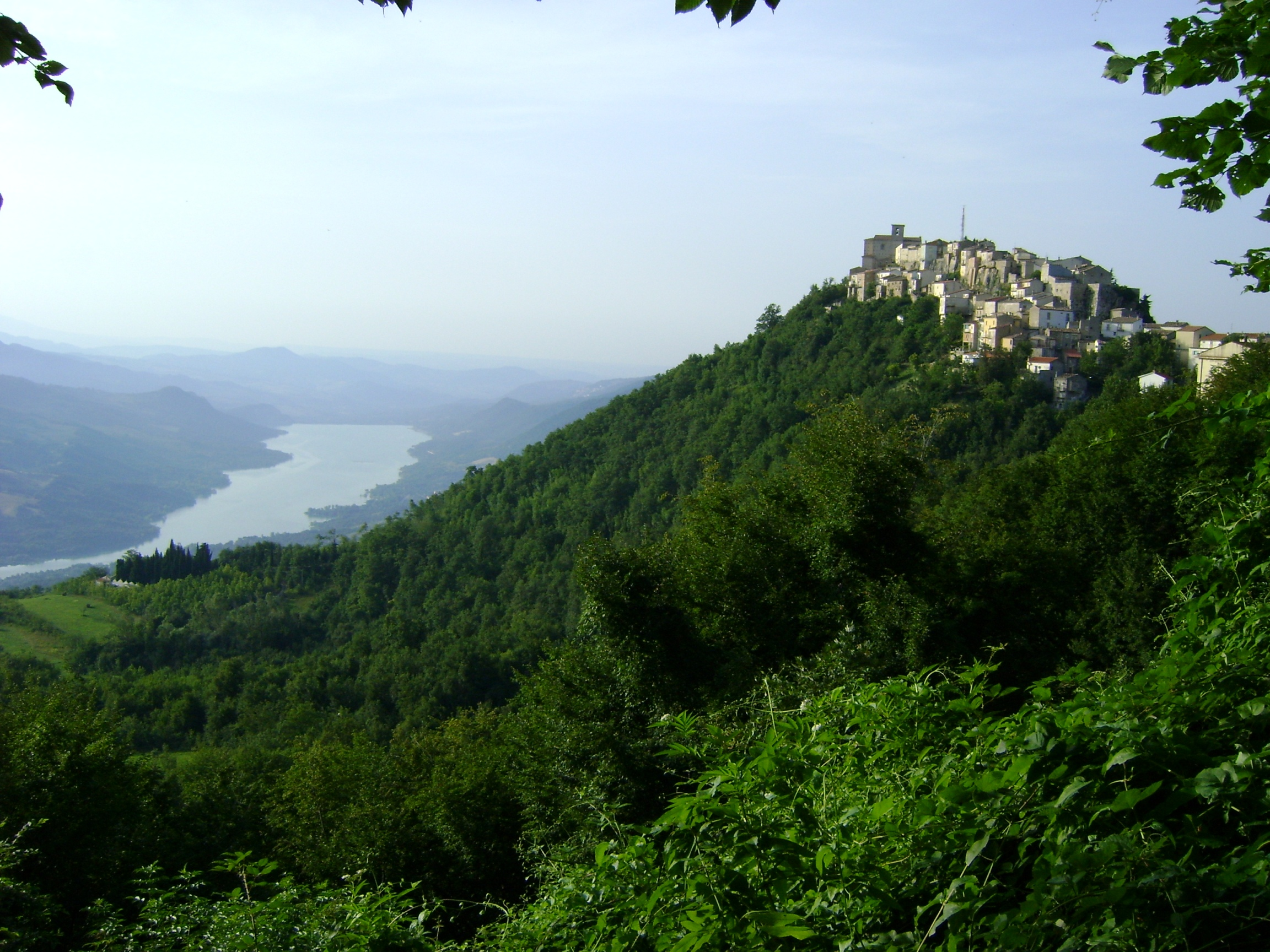
- Lago di Bomba nestled under Monteferrante

- Location within Abruzzo
- Location: Province of Chieti, Abruzzo
- Coordinates: 42°N 14.362°E
- Primary inflows: Sangro
- Primary outflows: Sangro
- Basin countries: Italy
- Max. length: 5.7 km (3.5 mi)
- Max. width: 0.8 km (0.50 mi)
- Surface area: 2.5 km^{2} (0.97 sq mi)
- Surface elevation: 262 m (860 ft)

Lago di Bomba, also called Lago di Sangro, is a lake in the Province of Chieti, Abruzzo, Italy. At an elevation of 262 m, its surface area is about 2.5 km^{2} (0.97 sq mi). To the south of the lake is Villa Santa Maria and to the north of the lake is Bomba.

== See also ==
- Lake Casoli
