= Rosello =

Comune in Abruzzo, Italy

- Comune
- Comune di Rosello

- Location within Italy Location within Abruzzo
- Coordinates: 41°54′N 14°21′E
- Country: Italy
- Region: Abruzzo
- Province: Chieti (CH)
- Frazioni: Colle Tasso, Giuliopoli

Area
  - Total: 19 km^{2} (7.3 sq mi)
- Elevation: 927 m (3,041 ft)

Population (2004)
  - Total: 322
  - Density: 17/km^{2} (44/sq mi)
- Demonym: rosellani
- Time zone: UTC+1 (CET)
  - Summer (DST): UTC+2 (CEST)
- Postal code: 66040
- Dialing code: 0872
- Saint day: 8 September
- Website: Official website

Rosello (Italian pronunciation: [roˈzɛllo]) is a village and comune (municipality) of the province of Chieti in the Abruzzo region of Central Italy. A number of city-dwellers have summer homes in the area.

== Geography ==
The village borders the following comuni: Agnone, Borrello, Roio del Sangro and Villa Santa Maria.

== History ==
The village was first inhabited around the 11th century by Benedictine monks from the Abbey of San Giovanni in Verde. It first appears in the historical record in the 12th century, where it was described as a 'charming village' by Giulio Caracciolo.

A picture entitled 'Maria SS delle Grazie' adorns the chapel near the cemetery. It is said to have been painted by an artist of the Neapolitan School between 1500 and 1600. It is very much the cultural highlight of the village.

During the Second World War Rosello was located along the Gustav Line and was destroyed by German soldiers in November of 1943.

Rosello was home to Renato Percario (6 September 1937 – 18 June 2008), chef to Princess Margaret, King Constantine and Ivana Trump.

== Notes and references ==
https://www.telegraph.co.uk/news/obituaries/2307674/Renato-Percario.html
