= Fallo =

- Comune
- Comune di Fallo
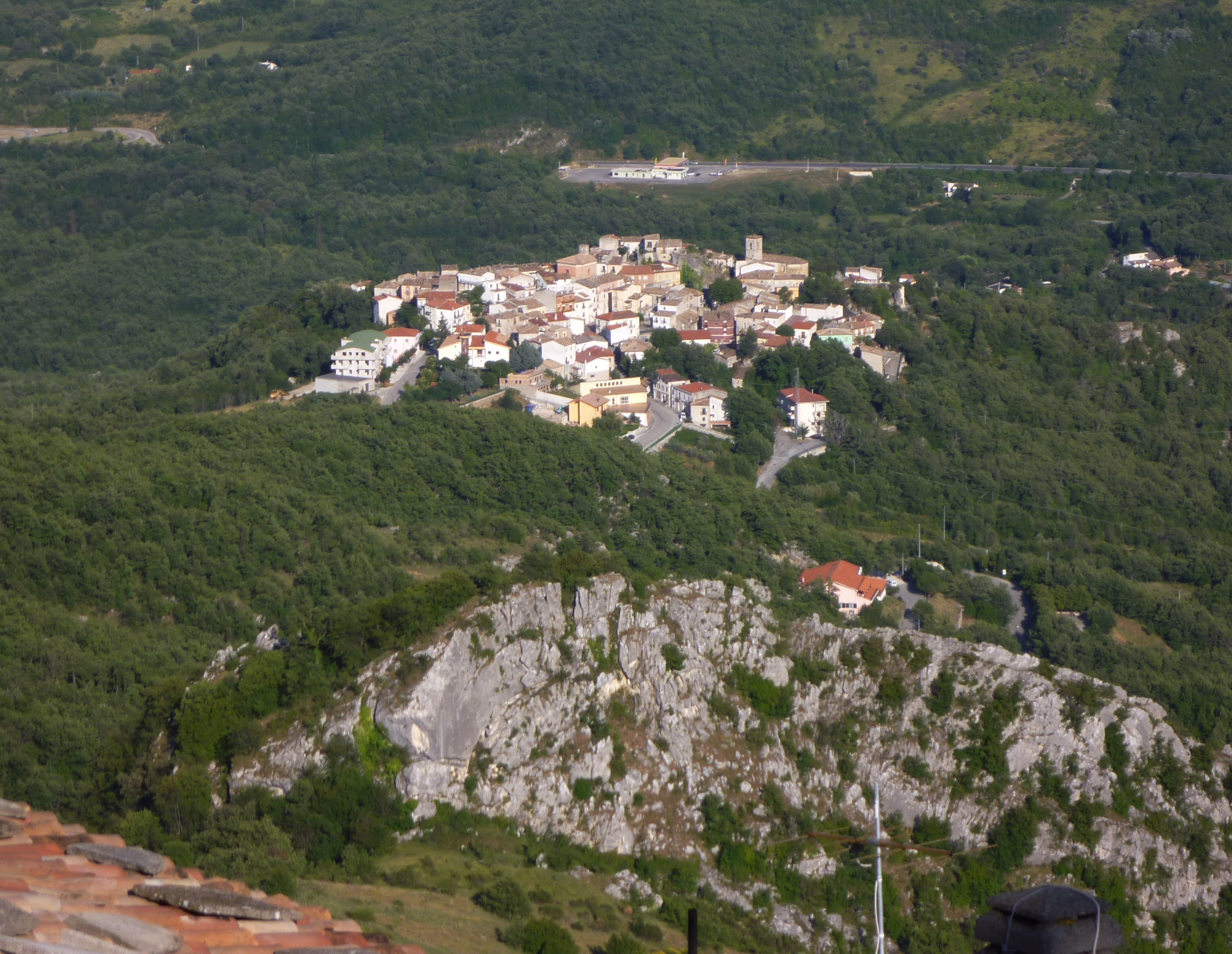
- Fallo

- Location within Italy Location within Abruzzo
- Coordinates: 41°56′N 14°19′E
- Country: Italy
- Region: Abruzzo
- Province: Chieti (CH)
- Frazioni: Borrello, Civitaluparella, Montelapiano, Villa Santa Maria

Area
  - Total: 5 km^{2} (1.9 sq mi)
- Elevation: 575 m (1,886 ft)

Population (1 January 2008)
  - Total: 155
  - Density: 31/km^{2} (80/sq mi)
- Demonym: Fallesi
- Time zone: UTC+1 (CET)
  - Summer (DST): UTC+2 (CEST)
- Postal code: 66040
- Dialing code: 0872
- ISTAT code: 069104
- Patron saint: San Vincenzo Ferreri
- Saint day: 5 April

Fallo (Abruzzese: Fàlle) is a comune and town in the Province of Chieti in the Abruzzo region of Italy.
