= Sambuceto =

Sambuceto may refer to either of two frazioni in the Italian province of Chieti, Abruzzo:

- Sambuceto, Bomba
- Sambuceto, San Giovanni Teatino
