= Archi, Abruzzo =

Archi
- Comune
- Comune di Archi
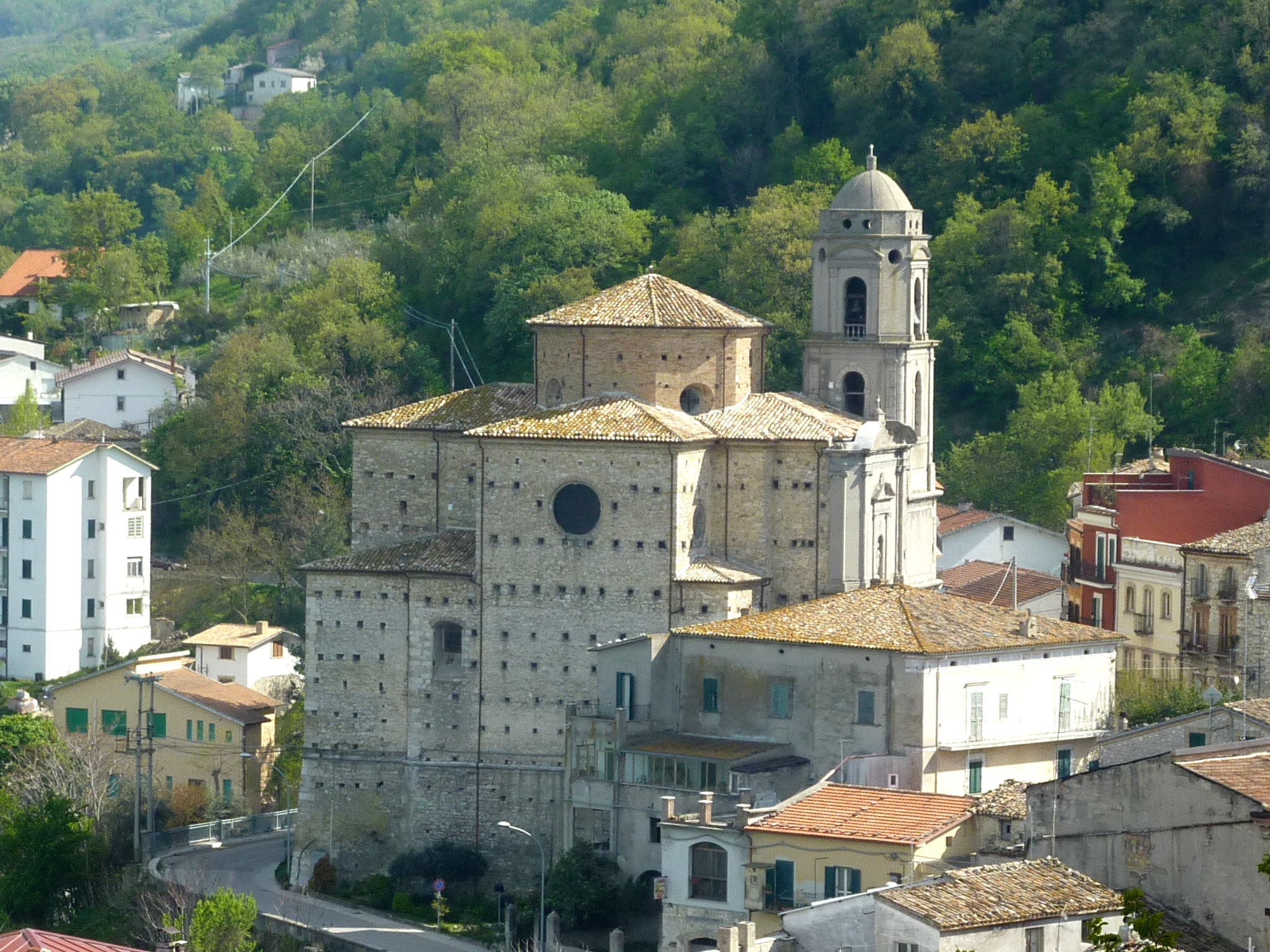
- The church of Santa Maria dell’Olmo

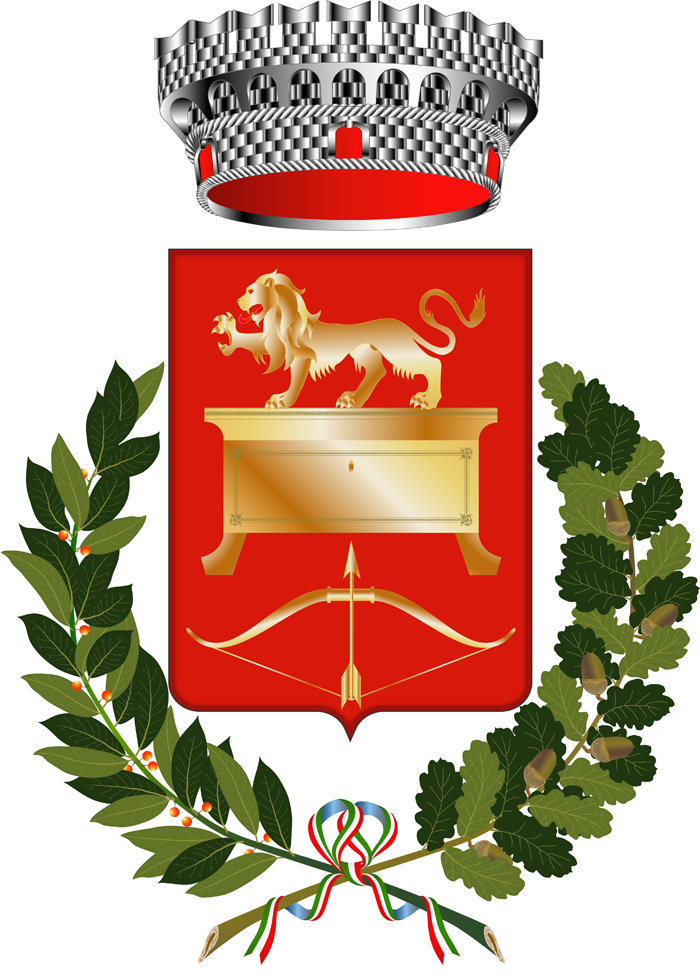
- Coat of arms

- Location of Archi in Italy Archi (Abruzzo)
- Coordinates: 42°5′N 14°23′E
- Country: Italy
- Region: Abruzzo
- Province: Chieti (CH)
- Frazioni: Caduna, Canala, Cannella, Colle della Guardia, Colle Verri, Fara d'Archi, Fonte Cittadone, Fonte Maggiore, Grotte, Ischia d'Archi, Macchie Pianello, Montagna, Piane d'Archi, Pianello, Rascitti, Rongiuna, Ruscitelli, San Luca, Sant'Amico, Solagne, Valle Franceschelli, Zainello

Government
  - Mayor: Marco Mario Troilo

Area
  - Total: 28.18 km^{2} (10.88 sq mi)
- Elevation: 492 m (1,614 ft)

Population (31 March 2017)
  - Total: 2,168
  - Density: 76.93/km^{2} (199.3/sq mi)
- Demonym: Archesi
- Time zone: UTC+1 (CET)
  - Summer (DST): UTC+2 (CEST)
- Postal code: 66044
- Dialing code: 0872
- Patron saint: St. Vitalis
- Saint day: 28 April
- Website: Official website

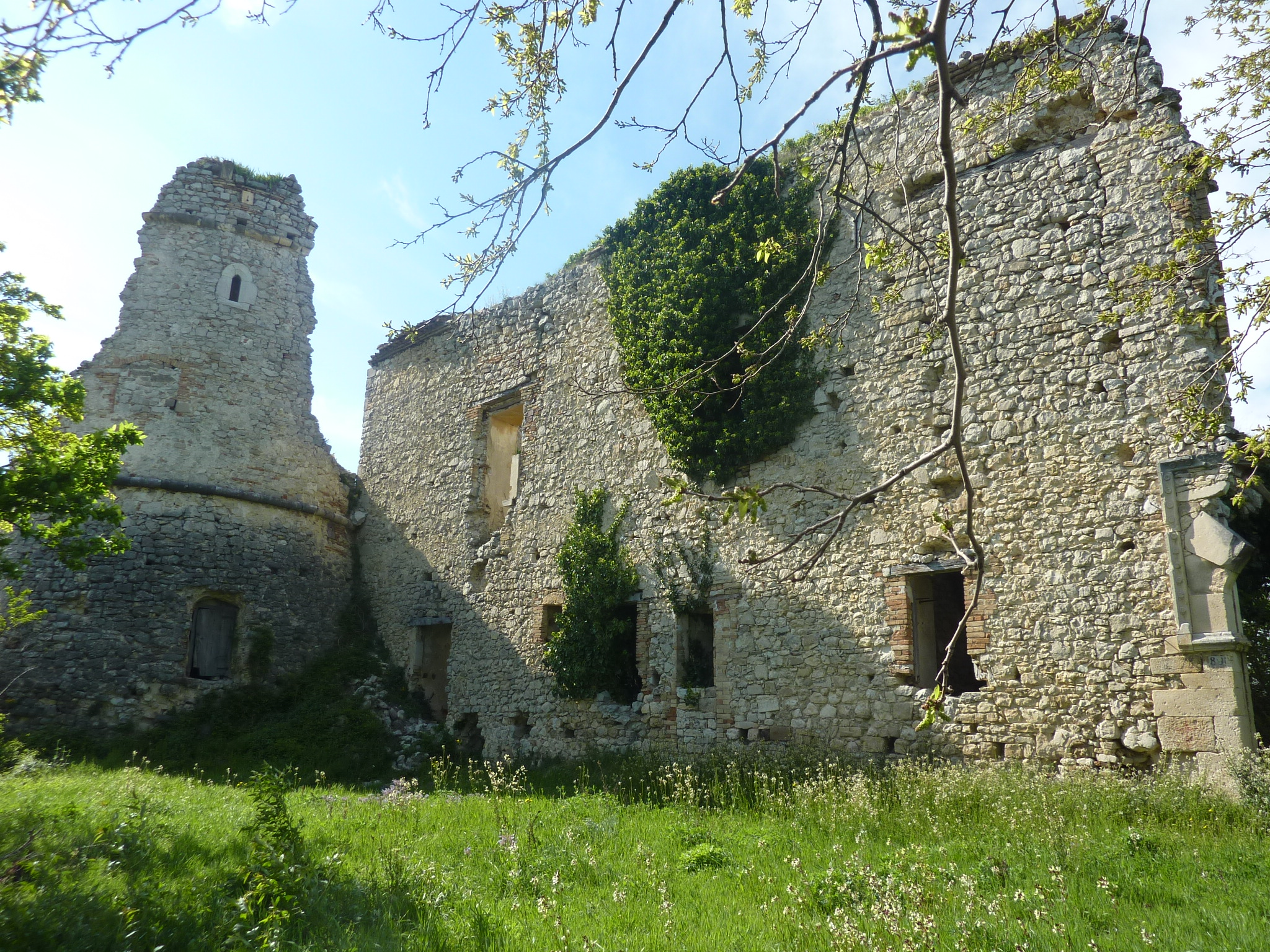
Remains of the baronial castle.

Archi (Abruzzese: Iìrchë) is a town and comune in the province of Chieti, Abruzzo, southern Italy. It is part of the Valsangro mountain community.

== Geography ==
The town of Archi is located on a rocky outcrop overlooking the Val di Sangro and Valle dell'Aventino. It covers 2818 hectares, and borders with the municipalities of Perano, Atessa, Tornareccio, Bomba, Roccascalegna and Altino. The Sangro river flows in the area.

== History ==
The area Archi was already inhabited as early as the 11th-7th centuries BC, as testified by the Bronze Age Fonte Tasca site, whose defensive works still existed in the Hellenistic age.

In the Middle Ages, Archi was a fortified center that, together with Casoli and Roccascalegna, constituted a defensive triangle that blocked the passage from the eastern Maiella to the Sangro valley

In the Norman period, the town was entrusted to two soldiers managed by one Marsilius Trogisii. Later, Charles I of Anjou gave it for thirty ounces a year to one Berardo. Later he was held by various families including: Carafa, De Secura, Guevara, Crispano, Pignatelli, Cardone and finally the Adimari marquises of Bomba. After their last heir died without heirs, Archi returned to the royal direct control.

== Main sights ==
- Sanctuary of San Rocco
- Parish church of Santa Maria dell'Olmo
- Church of St. John the Baptist
- Church of Madonna del Rosario
- ChuSantissimo Salvatore.
- Remains of the medieval castle. Characterized by a 16th-century tower, the castle was almost square with cylindrical corner towers. The construction is in local stone and mortar. Some elements of the castle show that the structure has been remodeled over time. In World War II it was used as a military outpost by the British, and was partly destroyed by the Germans.
- Remains of the fortified walls of the town
- Baronial Palace. It is a fortified quadrangular building with corner towers and bastions. It is located in the historic center in a dominant position on the town itself.
- Palazzo Cieri
- Palazzo Angelucci-Cangiano
- Palazzo Lannutti
- Palazzo Pomilio
- Archaeological site of Fonte Tasca (11th-7th century BC)
