= Piane d'Archi =

Coordinates: 42.1049°N 14.3708°E

- Frazione
- Interactive map of Piane d'Archi
- Country: Italy
- Region: Abruzzo
- Province: Chieti
- Commune: Archi, Abruzzo
- Time zone: UTC+1 (CET)
  - Summer (DST): UTC+2 (CEST)

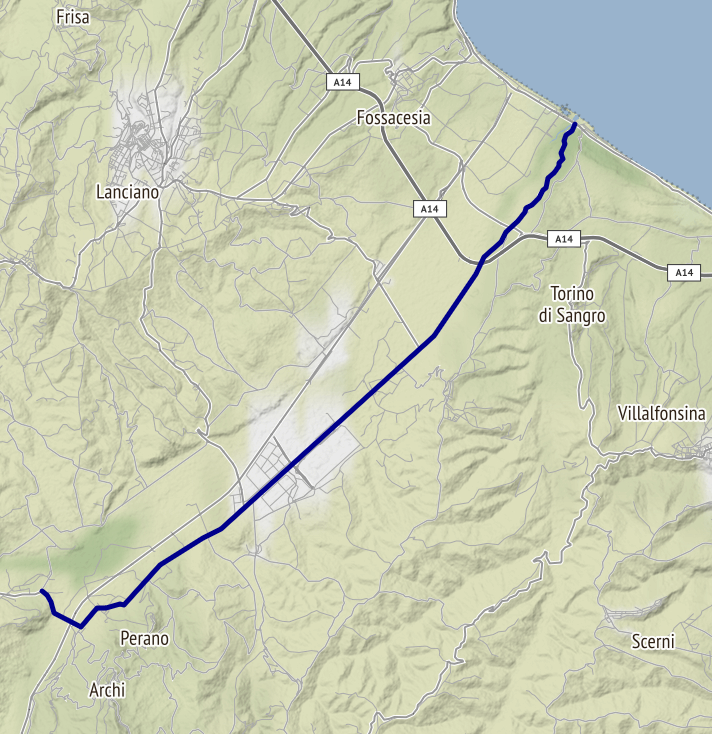

Piane d'Archi is a frazione of Archi, in the Province of Chieti in the Abruzzo, region of Italy. The local church is Parocchia Ss. Salvatore (church of the Holiest Savior).
