= Marchitelli =

Marchitelli is an Italian surname. Notable people with the surname include:

- Chiara Marchitelli (born 1985), Italian women's footballer
- Lele Marchitelli (born 1955), Italian musician and composer
- Pietro Marchitelli (1643–1729), Italian violinist
- Rosa Marchitelli, Canadian journalist
