= San Giovanni Lipioni =

- Comune
- Comune di San Giovanni Lipioni
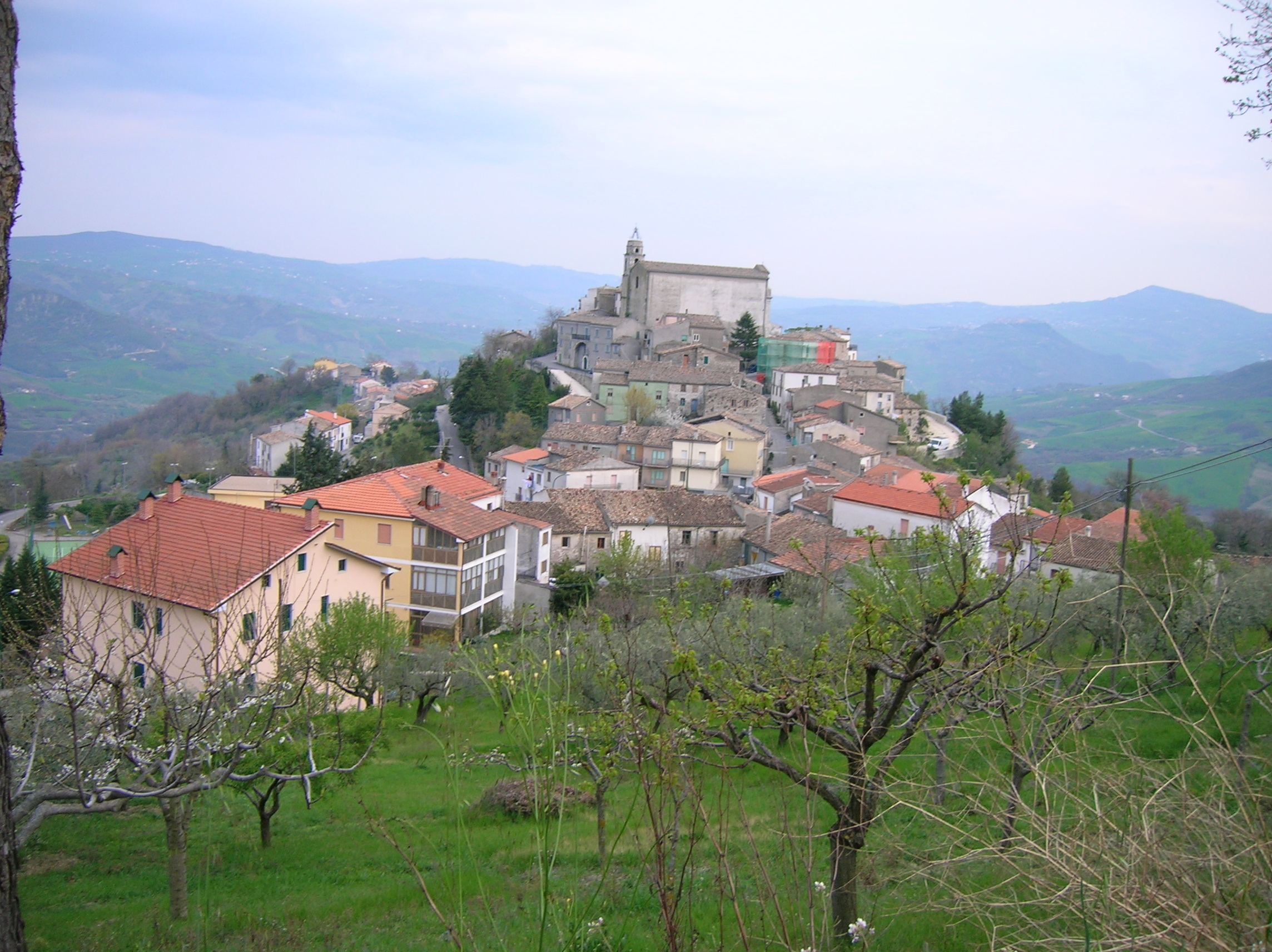
- San Giovanni Lipioni

- Coat of arms

- Location within Italy Location within Abruzzo
- Coordinates: 41°51′N 14°34′E
- Country: Italy
- Region: Abruzzo
- Province: Chieti (CH)

Government
  - Mayor: Catherine Aurore Rossi

Area
  - Total: 8.67 km^{2} (3.35 sq mi)
- Elevation: 545 m (1,788 ft)

Population (31 March 2017)
  - Total: 177
  - Density: 20.4/km^{2} (52.9/sq mi)
- Demonym: Sangiovannesi
- Time zone: UTC+1 (CET)
  - Summer (DST): UTC+2 (CEST)
- Postal code: 66050
- Dialing code: 0873
- Patron saint: St. Felix
- Saint day: August, 21st
- Website: Official website

San Giovanni Lipioni is a small village and comune located at the southernmost tip of province of Chieti in the Abruzzo region of Italy, on a 545-metre (1,788 ft) hill overlooking the river Trigno valley.

== Geography ==
The village lies at an elevation of 545 metres (1,788 ft). The territory's highest peaks are Colle Vernone (717 metres (2,352 ft)), overlooking the village, and the mountain Il Monte, 693 metres (2,274 ft), facing it. Oaks and beeches are the predominant trees, along with firs and pine trees. Olive trees are also quite widespread over the territory, followed by fig, apple and cherry trees. Bush vegetation includes several type of wild berries and yellow brooms blooming in mid-springtime. Fauna features increasing numbers of boars and foxes, owls, and a few EU-protected species of kites (Milvus milvus and Milvus migrans) that nest in the woods of Il Monte and its vicinity.

The nearest villages are Torrebruna and Celenza sul Trigno at a distance of 7 kilometres (4 mi) each. The river Trigno, separating Abruzzo from Molise, runs in the valley beneath the village for 5.5 kilometres (3.4 mi).

== History ==
The first settlement in the village presumably dates back to the pre-Roman times, when the area was under the control of the Samnites. A 3rd century BC bronze man's head was discovered in the village's countryside in 1847, currently stored at the Bibliothèque Nationale de France.

Starting from the 14th century, the village was under the Kingdom of Naples through the Aragon and the D'Avalos family, of Spanish origin, who held possessions in the nearby coastal town of Vasto. The name Lipioni is thought indeed to be derived from the Spanish los peones ("unskilled labourers"), referring to the predominant peasantry condition and sheep-rearing activity of the village's inhabitants.

Until 1861, when it became part of unified Italy, the village was under control of the Caracciolo family.

== Economy ==
Economy is essentially based on agriculture. The main produces are wine and olive oil, along with wheat, corn, cherries, apples, walnuts, almonds, artichokes, tomatoes, and peppers.

San Giovanni Lipioni at dusk, viewed from the foot of Colle Vernone

== Demographics ==
After the end of World War II, because of severe poverty and high unemployment, the village suffered a considerable emigration towards richer Northern Italy areas, especially in the town of Bologna, where a sizeable community live nowadays. A small number also migrated to Belgium, in the Charleroi area to work in the local coal mines, and France by subsequently settling there. From around 900 units in 1951, the population halved to 457 in 1982, and down to 371 in 1991, according to official ISTAT statistics. In 2001 the total population plummeted to 271 units and in 2006 the residents were less than 250, of which those aged 65+ accounted for half of the total.

== Main sights ==
Santa Liberata chapel

- Historical centre
- 17th-century church of Santa Maria delle Grazie, sitting at the top of a path of more than 200 steps starting from the pedestrianised main square Piazza Largo del Popolo.
- Historical house of Rossi family (Casa Madre), built in 1650, nowadays property of Rossi-Cianci family.
- Historical fountain
- Chapel of Santa Liberata, at the foot of Colle Vernone
- The paved road from the village to Il Monte mountain makes for an easy 5-kilometre (3.1 mi) walking trail, offering views over the river Trigno valley. On a clear day, the Adriatic Sea can be spotted 29 kilometres (18 mi) to the northeast as well as the Maiella ridge, 50 kilometres (31 mi) northwest, and the Matese mountains, 47 kilometres (29 mi) southwest.

== Culture ==
Piazza Largo del Popolo.

On May 1 a colourful pageant is held throughout the village's high streets to celebrate lu Maje (The May), a circle-shaped wooden cane decked with small bunches of wild pink underbrush violets and other spring flowers and carried at the forefront of the pageant, which kicks off at the main church soon after the late morning mass.

In early August night-time food feasts (called sagre) are common. One of these is the sagn' app'zat (literally "sagnas cut into pieces"), which are freshly made, slightly thick pasta layers sliced into rough 5-by-5-centimetre (2 by 2 in) squares and eaten with a simple basil-and-tomato sauce, extra-virgin olive oil, and occasionally topped with lumps of ricotta cheese and/or bits of sliced spicy red chillies.

On every second Saturday of October, the food feast of the scurpelle—simple salted sourdough batons, 20 to 30 centimetres (8 to 12 in) long, deep-fried in olive oil and eaten as such, accompanied by a glass of new red wine—is made to celebrate Santa Liberata.

== Cuisine ==
Local food specialities include the ventricina, a usually round-shaped salami made of fresh pork finely chopped and mingled with bits of lard, ground dried red medium-spicy peppers, fennel seeds, and coarse salt, usually prepared during the colder winter days of January (after the first snow falls it is tradition to slaughter a pig), then hanged on the ceiling in a dry room and seasoned for usually more than one month until ready to be sliced and served with freshly baked bread as an appetizer. At the same time, fresh pork sausages and pig liver sausages and several varieties of salami are prepared as well.
