= Lentella =

- Comune
- Comune di Lentella
- Location within Italy Location within Abruzzo
- Coordinates: 42°0′N 14°41′E
- Country: Italy
- Region: Abruzzo
- Province: Chieti (CH)
- Frazioni: Cupello, Fresagrandinaria, Mafalda (CB), Montenero di Bisaccia (CB)

Area
  - Total: 12 km^{2} (4.6 sq mi)
- Elevation: 398 m (1,306 ft)

Population (2004)
  - Total: 748
  - Density: 62/km^{2} (160/sq mi)
- Demonym: Lentellesi
- Time zone: UTC+1 (CET)
  - Summer (DST): UTC+2 (CEST)
- Postal code: 66050
- Dialing code: 0873
- ISTAT code: 069047

Lentella (Abruzzese: Lendèllë) is a comune and town in the Province of Chieti in the Abruzzo region of Italy
