= Cascate del Rio Verde =

Waterfalls in the Italian Apennines

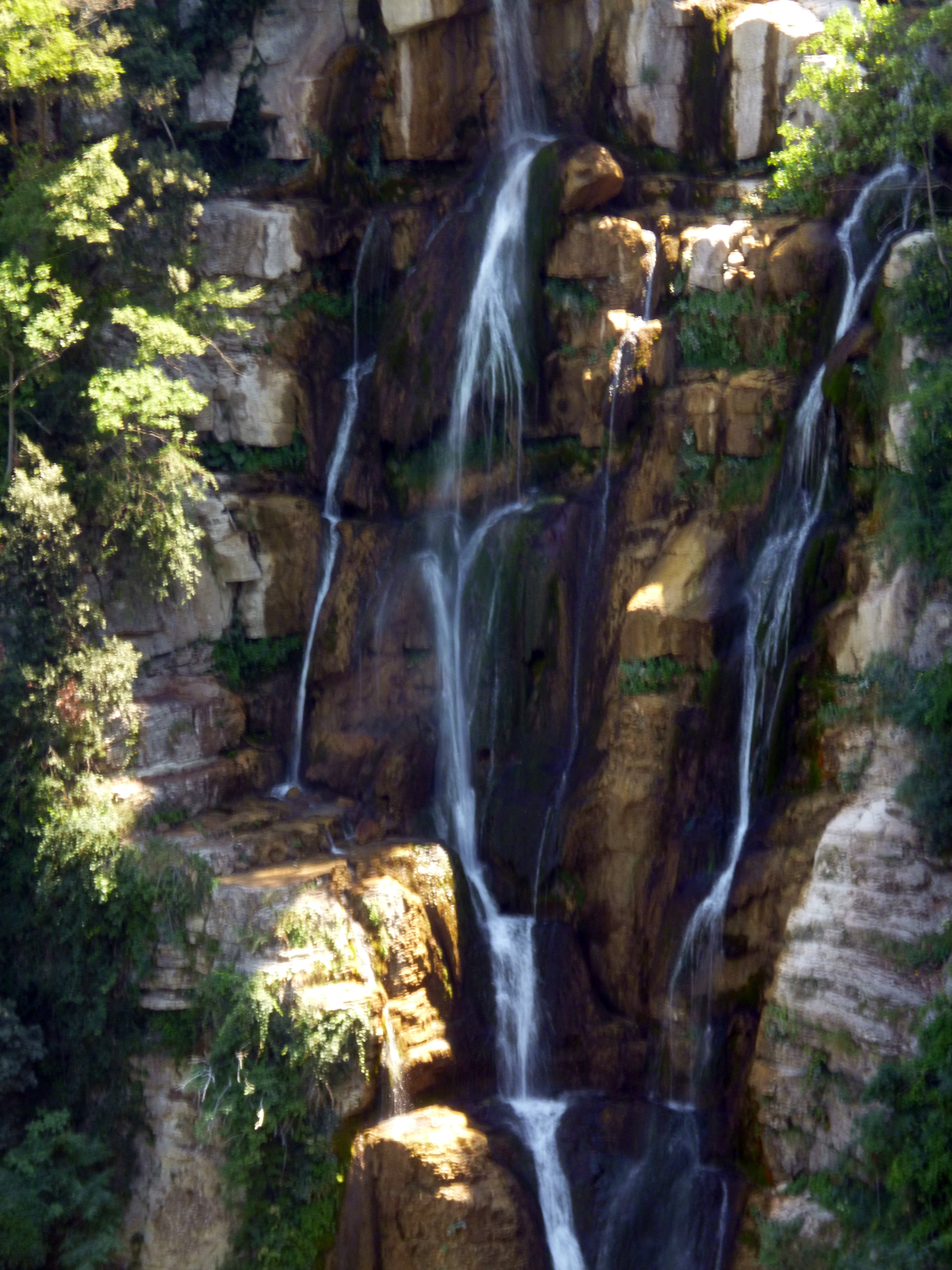
The Cascate del Rio Verde in August

Cascate del Rio Verde, located in Borrello, are the highest natural waterfalls in the Italian Apennines.

Cascate del Rio Verde consists of three jumps for a total of over 200 meters. The panorama is made up of rocks, made up of calcarenites and marls resting on clay.

== See also ==
- List of waterfalls
