= Castello Franceschelli =

Fortified palace in Abruzzo, Italy

Coordinates: 41.9495°N 14.4293°E

Franceschelli Castle
- Castello Franceschelli
- Montazzoli
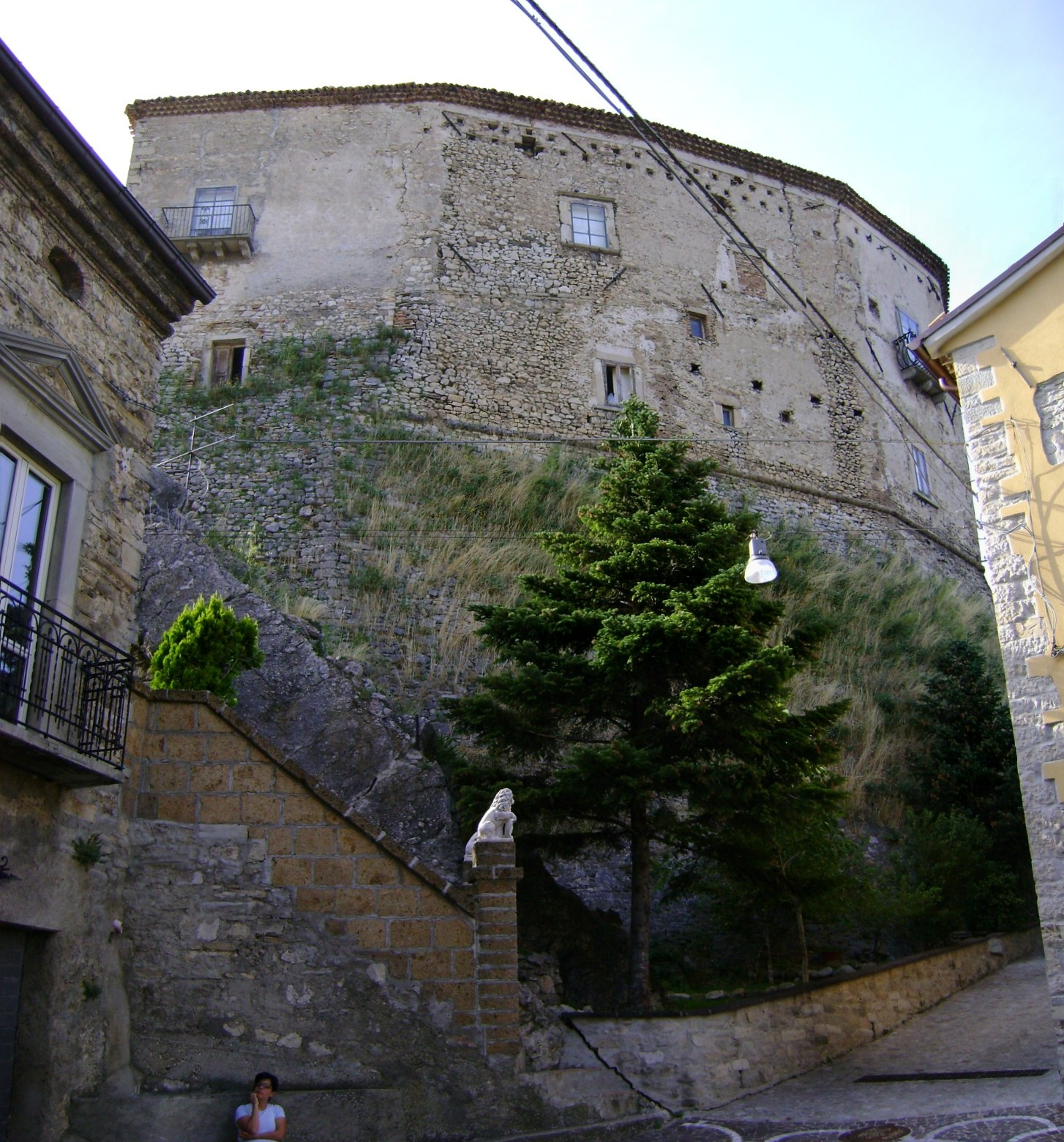
- Castle in Montazzoli

Site information
- Type: Castle

Location
- Location within Italy

Site history
- Built: 17th century

Castello Franceschelli (Italian for Franceschelli Castle) is a fortified palace in Montazzoli, Province of Chieti (Abruzzo).

== History ==
The ancient castle dates back to Norman (11th century). There is little evidence of the medieval period, because already in the 15th century the castle was abandoned. In the seventeenth century the rest of the castle was restored by the noble family of Franceschelli, who adapted the fortress in baronial building.

== Architecture ==
Some scholars believe that the castle to have originated from a square tower situated on the north side at the inner courtyard which controlled the northern part of the Colle Ripa. An outdoor courtyard to the east consisted of mill, oil mill and warehouses. Access to the castle is possible via two roads that end in the outdoor courtyard. The oldest road is the one located at the old factories and warehouses, road today no longer viable, the other road, the paved path issue and reached from the south through a drawbridge that serves a cobbled stairway which leads on a plane with a scene.

The north façade was rebuilt after the earthquake of 1907, the facade of which remains a buttressed base and a small corner portion. Through a portal in sandstone and limestone one enters a courtyard covered with a barrel vault with lunettes in which there is stored the beam which put up the drawbridge. From the inner courtyard you can get into some apartments, formerly used as stables and servants quarters and made habitable by the last heirs of his vassals i.e. Franceschelli in 1920, the cellars and the former prisons where there is a sandstone block with written "Nolite nocere" which means "do not do this wicked thing." From the courtyard there is a ramp that puts in the noble quarter divided into several private apartments and only one of them inhabited by the descendants of the feudal lords. The present structure is due to the 16th-17th century.

Before the arrival of the Barons Franceschelli in the castle in 1686 they alternated in the same the Sangro and Gizzi. The courtyard of irregular shape adapted to the terrain has seen close around the castle in the various changes that occurred over time.
