= Giuliopoli =

- Frazione
- Interactive map of Giuliopoli
- Coordinates: 41°55′19″N 14°21′28″E
- Country: Italy
- Region: Abruzzo
- Province: Chieti
- Commune: Rosello
- Time zone: UTC+1 (CET)
  - Summer (DST): UTC+2 (CEST)

Giuliopoli is a frazione (borough) in the municipality of Rosello, Province of Chieti, in the Abruzzo region of Italy.
