= Casoli =

- Comune
- Comune di Casoli
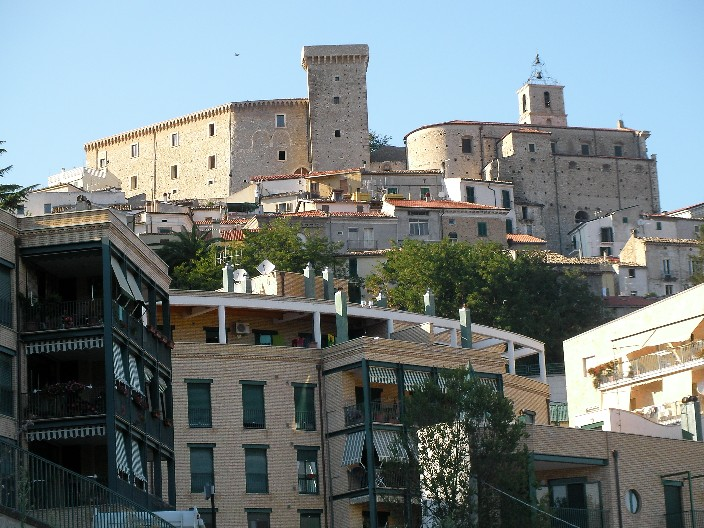
- The church and the castle of Casoli

- Location within Italy Location within Abruzzo
- Coordinates: 42°07′N 14°17′E
- Country: Italy
- Region: Abruzzo
- Province: Province of Chieti (CH)
- Frazioni: Ascigno, Capoposta, Cappacorti, Caprafico, Cavassutti, Cinonni, Cipollaro, Collebarone, Collelungo, Collemarco, Colle della Torre, Coste Martini, Fiorentini, Grottarimposta, Guarenna Nuova, Guarenna Vecchia, Laroma, Laroscia, Mandramancina, Merosci, Minco di Lici, Monti, Piana delle vacche, Pianibbie, Piano Carlino, Piano del Mulino, Piano la Fara, Piano Laroma, Piano Morelli, Piano delle Vigne, Quarto da Capo, Ripitella, Selva Piana, Serra, Taloni, Torretta, Valle Curato, Verratti, Vicenne, Vizzarri

Government
  - Mayor: Sergio De Luca

Area
  - Total: 66 km^{2} (25 sq mi)
- Elevation: 378 m (1,240 ft)

Population (December 31, 2004)
  - Total: 5,901
  - Density: 89/km^{2} (230/sq mi)
- Demonym: Casolani
- Time zone: UTC+1 (CET)
  - Summer (DST): UTC+2 (CEST)
- Postal code: 66043
- Dialing code: 0872
- Patron saint: Saint Reparata
- Saint day: October 8
- Website: Official website

Casoli (Abruzzese: Càsule) a comune and town in the Province of Chieti in the Abruzzo region of Italy.

== Description ==
Casoli is situated on a foothill of the Majella mountain, at the base of which runs the Aventino River, tributary of the Sangro. As of 31 December 2004, it had a population of 5,901 and an area of 66 square kilometres (25 mi^{2}).

Casoli borders the following municipalities: Altino, Civitella Messer Raimondo, Gessopalena, Guardiagrele, Palombaro, Roccascalegna, Sant'Eusanio del Sangro. It is one of I Borghi più belli d'Italia ("The most beautiful villages of Italy").

The closest airport is Abruzzo Airport, which is 35 miles drive. It is a 19-mile drive to the nearest beaches, Fossacesia Marina or Lido di Casalbordino. The town hospital is Presidio Ospedaliero Consalvi, but does also have the ASL 2-Guardia Medica di Cassoli medical center in town. The closest train station is in Lanciano, which is 15 miles away. 4 miles from town is the picturesque Lake Casoli, also known as Lago Sant'Angelo.

== History ==
It was the ancient settlement of Cluviae, a city of the Caraceni tribe that was the territory most probably conquered by Lombards in the 6th century. The medieval name "castri de Casule" was first recorded in 878 AD in the Memoriatorium abbatis Berthari, a manuscript conserved in the Abbey of Monte Cassino.

The village was controlled, in the fourteenth century by the Orsini family, who fortified the Norman castle. Casoli became famous as part cultirale in the nineteenth century, when the Mayor Pasquale Masciantonio housed in the castle the poet Gabriele d'Annunzio. In World War II, Casoli did not suffer severe bombing, because it was declared a "free city" for the displaced.

== Main sights ==
- Castello Masciantonio: Norman castle of the eleventh century, with a tower and fortified ducal palace, which houses a museum. The room that housed Gabriele d'Annunzio is of particular interest for a dithyramb written by d'Annunzio on the wall, in thanks.
- Church of Santa Maria Maggiore: It was one of the Orsini chapel (14th century), and later in the seventeenth century it became a real church. It has a rectangular plan, with a side porch, Baroque mold.

== Frazioni ==
The frazioni of Casoli are Ascigno, Capoposta, Cappacorti, Caprafico, Cavassutti, Cinonni, Cipollaro, Collebarone, Collelungo, Collemarco, Colle della Torre, Coste Martini, Fiorentini, Grottarimposta, Guarenna Nuova, Guarenna Vecchia, Laroma, Laroscia, Mandramancina, Merosci, Minco di Lici, Monti, Pianibbie, Piano Carlino, Piano la Fara, Piano Laroma, Piano Morelli, Piano Mulino, Piano delle Vigne, Quarto da Capo, Ripitella, Selva Piana, Serra, Taloni, Torretta, Valle Curato, Verratti, Vicenne and Vizzarri.

== Demographic evolution ==
Historical population

Year	Pop.	±%
1861	5,970	—
1871	6,088	+2.0%
1881	6,109	+0.3%
1901	7,301	+19.5%
1911	7,892	+8.1%

Year	Pop.	±%
1921	7,659	−3.0%
1931	8,013	+4.6%
1936	8,319	+3.8%
1951	8,134	−2.2%
1961	7,377	−9.3%

Year	Pop.	±%
1971	6,324	−14.3%
1981	6,174	−2.4%
1991	6,116	−0.9%
2001	5,971	−2.4%

Source: Data from ISTAT

== Gallery ==
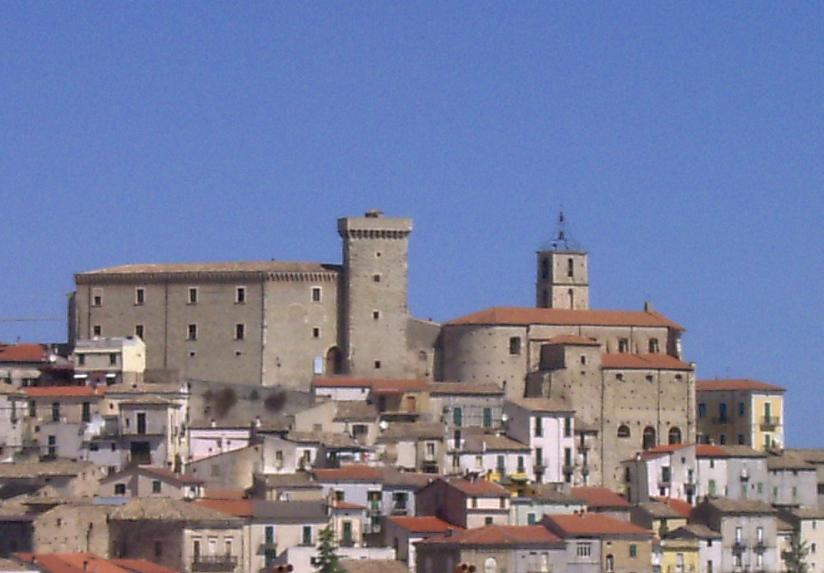

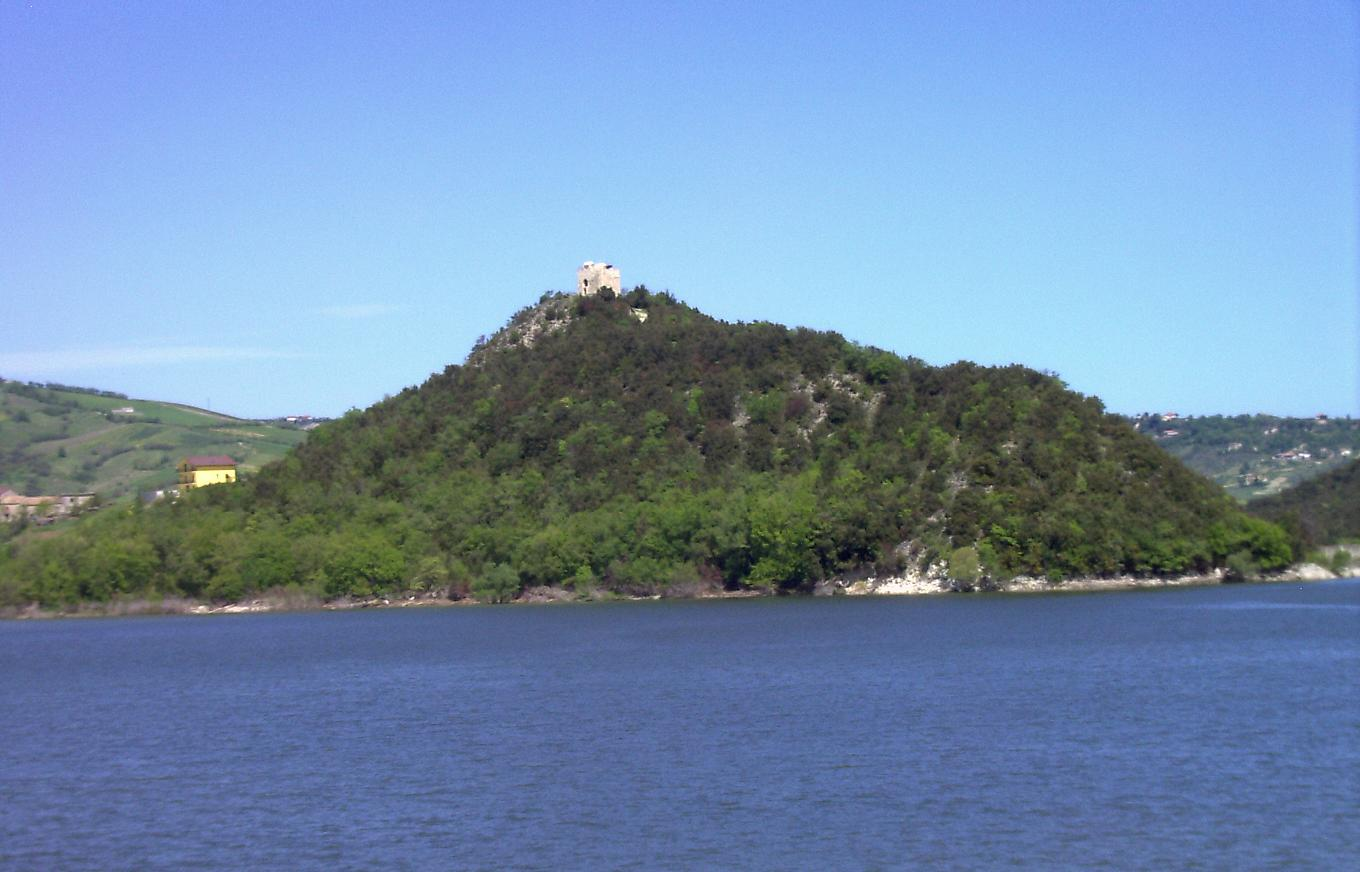

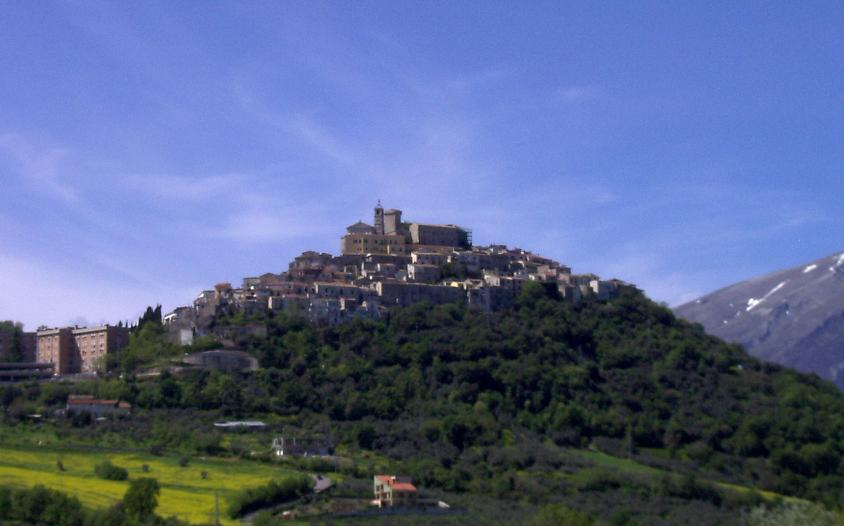

== Sister cities ==
- Canning, Western Australia, Australia

== See also ==
- Casoli internment camp
- Castello Masciantonio
- Lake Casoli
