= Caprafico, Chieti =

Caprafico
- Frazione
- Interactive map of Caprafico
- Coordinates: 42°05′00″N 14°05′00″E
- Country: Italy
- Region: Abruzzo
- Province: Chieti
- Communes: Guardiagrele, Casoli, Palombaro, Pennapiedimonte
- Time zone: UTC+1 (CET)
  - Summer (DST): UTC+2 (CEST)

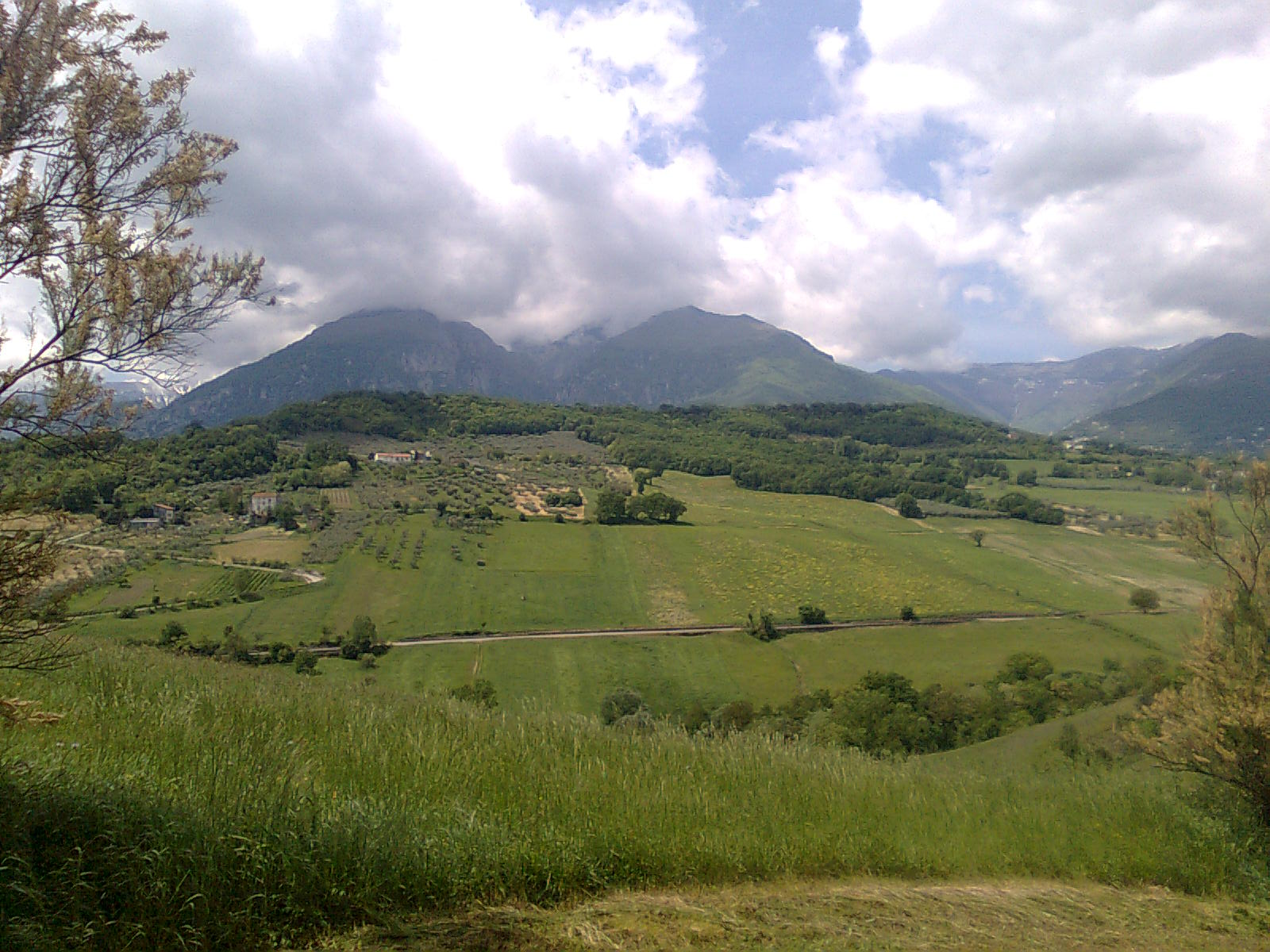
View of Caprafico from a nearby hill.

Caprafico (Abruzzese: Crapafic) is a frazione in the Province of Chieti in the Abruzzo region of Italy. Unusually, its territory belongs to four different municipalities: with the majority in Guardiagrele, just under half in Casoli and smaller portions in Palombaro and Pennapiedimonte.
