= Michele Mascitti =

Italian composer

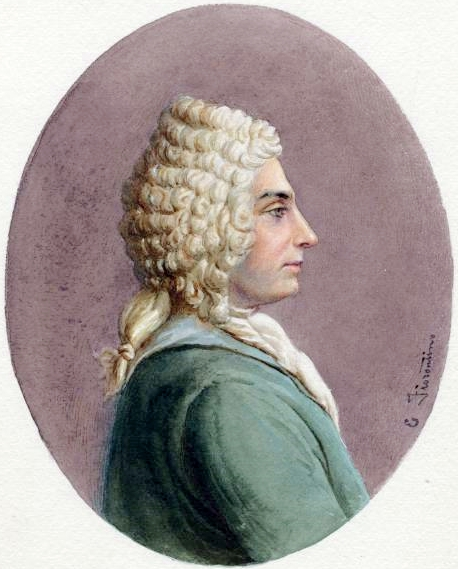
Michele Mascitti watercolor by "E. Fiorentino." [Antonio Enrico Fiorentino (1894-1962)] after Anne Marie Doublet

Michele Mascitti (1664 in Villa Santa Maria (from Chieti); 24 April 1760 in Paris) was an Italian violinist and Baroque composer.

== Life ==
Mascitti was educated by a relative, Pietro Marchitelli (1643-1729), a violinist in the royal court orchestra in Naples, and at the "Teatro San Bartolomeo", possibly by Corelli. Mascitti found a temporary position in the royal orchestra, but soon left. He traveled through Italy, and later throughout Europe, spending time in Germany and the Netherlands. He was under the protection of Cardinal Ottoboni and the reigning Duke of Bavaria. In 1704, he settled in Paris and took the Frenchified given name of Michel. He was naturalized French in 1739. Philippe d'Orléans was a patron, allowing Mascitti early appearances at the court of Versailles.

Mascitti published all nine of his sonata collections in Paris. The four concertos from Op. 7 follow the concerto grosso style of Corelli. During his lifetime, Mascitti enjoyed similar fame to Albinoni and Corelli. His compositions were mainly in the Italian, and sometimes French, style. They contained an abundance of novel harmonies for the period.

== Works ==
- 6 violin sonatas, and 6 trio sonatas Op. 1 (Sonata in three parts) (1704)
- 15 chamber sonatas with violin and cello Op. 2 (1706)
- 12 chamber sonatas with violin solo with the violone or harpsichord Op. 3 (1707)
- 8 violin sonatas and 6 trio sonatas Op. 4 (1711)
- 12 Sonatas Op. 5 (No. 12 "Psyche") (1714)
- 15 Sonatas for Violin and basso continuo Op. 6 (1722)
- 8 chamber sonatas for solo violin and bass, and 4 "concerts in six" Op. 7 (1727)
- 12 Sonatas for solo violin and bass Op. 8 (1731)
- 12 Sonatas for solo violin and bass Op. 9 (1738)
