= Casoli internment camp =

Campo di internamento di Casoli
- Concentration camp
- Location within Italy
- Coordinates: 42.1167°N 14.2833°E
- Location: Casoli
- Operated by: Italy
- Original use: Theatre
- Operational: 1940
- Inmates: Civilian
- Number of inmates: Jewish and Yugoslavian
- Liberated by: 1943

The internment camp in Casoli, in the province of Chieti, was one of several internment camps set up by the fascist government following the entry of Italy into World War II, to sit foreigners and anti-fascists. It operated from July 1940 to September 1943, with a capacity of 80–90 people. Jewish refugees from Germany and Austria were interned first, then "ex-Yugoslavs".

== History ==
On April 27, 1940, the former school in the municipality of Casoli and local property from Att. Innocent Tilli were identified as possible places of internment. They were replaced a few months later by another location of the same capacity, used in the past as a movie theatre.

The Ministry of the Interior decided to allocate the place to an internment camp for foreign Jews, Germans and Austrians. The camp's administration (activated June 10, 1940) was headed by the town's mayor: Moses Ricci, while monitoring was conferred to the police and health matters to Dr. Nicholas Raymond.

The first inmates arrived July 14, 1940, their number varying over time as a result of the numerous transfers between camps.

Conditions in this camp were better than in most other camps, due to inspections of the Red Cross taking place and inmates receiving international aid through DELASEM.

The work of Moses Ricci was even reported in October 1940 by local fascists for being too bland and sympathetic to the inmates, who enjoyed greater freedom of movement and with whom the local population tended to fraternize.

In May 1942, the 50 "foreign Jews" were transferred to another internment camp and in their place came 82 "ex-Yugoslavs" from Corropoli internment camp. The conditions worsened given the shortage of food and clothing, the lack of toilets and overcrowding, as alleged in Red Cross communications.

By September 8, 1943, the camp was closed, after the armistice was signed.

== See also ==
- Holocaust in Italy
