= Pietro Marchitelli =

Peter Marchitelli (Villa Santa Maria, 1643 - Naples, 1729) was an Italian violinist, and teacher of Michele Mascitti.

== Life ==
He was born in 1643 in the province of Chieti in Villa Santa Maria. He received a formal music education at the Conservatory of S. Mary of Loreto in 1657. Recognized as a talented violinist and teacher, Marchitelli took the role of first violin in the most prestigious musical institutions in Naples: the Chapel Royal of Naples and the orchestra of the Teatro San Bartolomeo. He was a close friend of Alessandro Scarlatti during his career, and held in high esteem by his contemporaries. Marchitelli died of old age and was buried at the Chiesa di San Nicola alla Carità in Naples, in 1729. He owned seven beloved Cremonese violins, three violets and a guitar.
