= Castello Masciantonio =

Coordinates: 42.1188°N 14.2924°E

Masciantonio Castle
- Castello Masciantonio
- Casoli
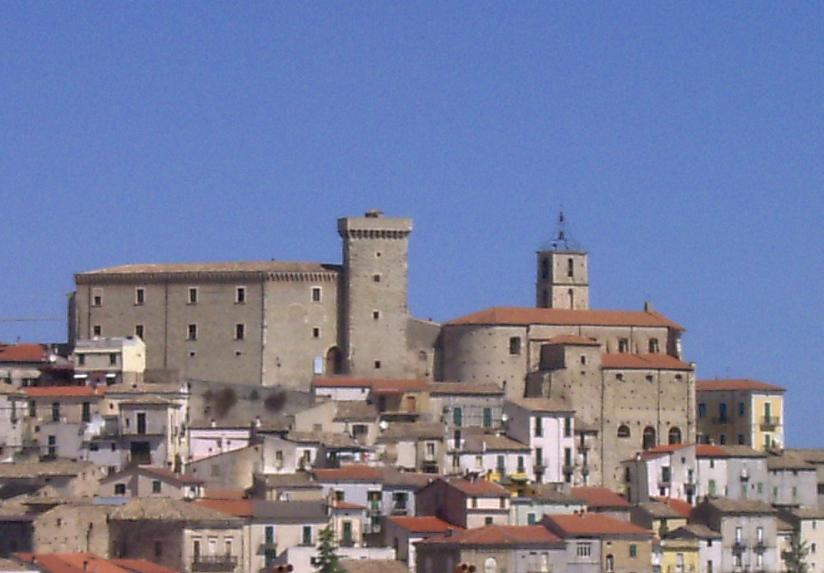
- Castle in Casoli

Site information
- Type: Castle

Location

Site history
- Built: 15th century

Castello Masciantonio (Italian for Masciantonio Castle) is a Renaissance castle in Casoli, Province of Chieti (Abruzzo).

== History ==
The castle was built by the Normans in the eleventh century. Of the original structure only the tower remains. The castle was then enlarged by the Orsini family in the fourteenth century, and later was a possession of various Italian noble families, including Pasquale Masciantonio. It was here that the poet Gabriele d'Annunzio sought refuge.

== Architecture ==
The ducal palace is an irregular rectangular layout, divided into two sectors by cornice. The interior Opsite a garden with well. The control tower stands between the castle and the parish church, with beccatell on top.
