= Montelapiano =

- Comune
- Comune di Montelapiano
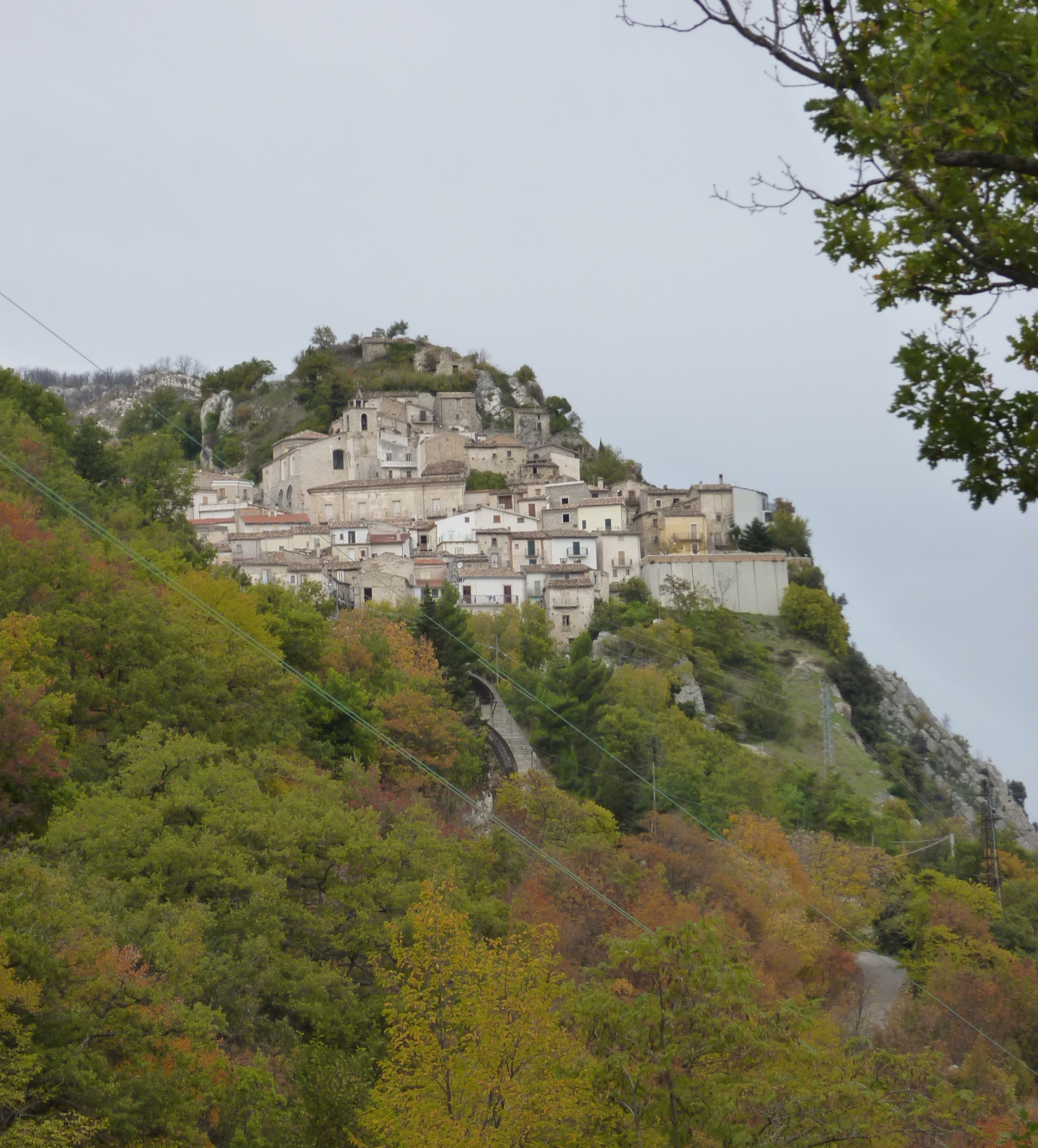
- View of Montelapiano

- Location within Italy Location within Abruzzo
- Coordinates: 41°58′N 14°21′E
- Country: Italy
- Region: Abruzzo
- Province: Chieti (CH)

Area
  - Total: 8.27 km^{2} (3.19 sq mi)
- Elevation: 740 m (2,430 ft)

Population (2026)
  - Total: 68
  - Density: 8.2/km^{2} (21/sq mi)
- Demonym: Montelapianesi
- Time zone: UTC+1 (CET)
  - Summer (DST): UTC+2 (CEST)
- Postal code: 66040
- Dialing code: 0872
- ISTAT code: 069053
- Saint day: 18 August
- Website: Official website

Montelapiano is a village and comune (municipality) in the Province of Chieti in the region of Abruzzo in Italy. With a population of 68, it is the least populous non-alpine municipality (not belonging to the regions of Piedmont, Valle d'Aosta, Lombardy, Veneto, Trentino-Alto Adige/Südtirol or Friuli-Venezia Giulia) in Italy, as well as the least populous in Abruzzo.

Montelapiano borders the municipalities of Civitaluparella, Fallo, Montebello sul Sangro, and Villa Santa Maria.

== Demographics ==
As of 2026, the population is 68, of which 47.1% are male, and 52.9% are female. Minors make up 7.4% of the population, and seniors make up 51.5%.

Historical population

Year	Pop.	±%
1861	913	—
1871	826	−9.5%
1881	797	−3.5%
1901	636	−20.2%
1911	651	+2.4%
1921	553	−15.1%
1931	575	+4.0%
1936	570	−0.9%

Year	Pop.	±%
1951	629	+10.4%
1961	521	−17.2%
1971	335	−35.7%
1981	228	−31.9%
1991	164	−28.1%
2001	107	−34.8%
2011	80	−25.2%
2021	77	−3.7%

Source: ISTAT

=== Immigration ===
As of 2025, immigrants make up 7.5% of the total population. The 3 largest foreign countries of origin are Romania, Albania, and Venezuela.
