= Montazzoli =

- Comune
- Comune di Montazzoli
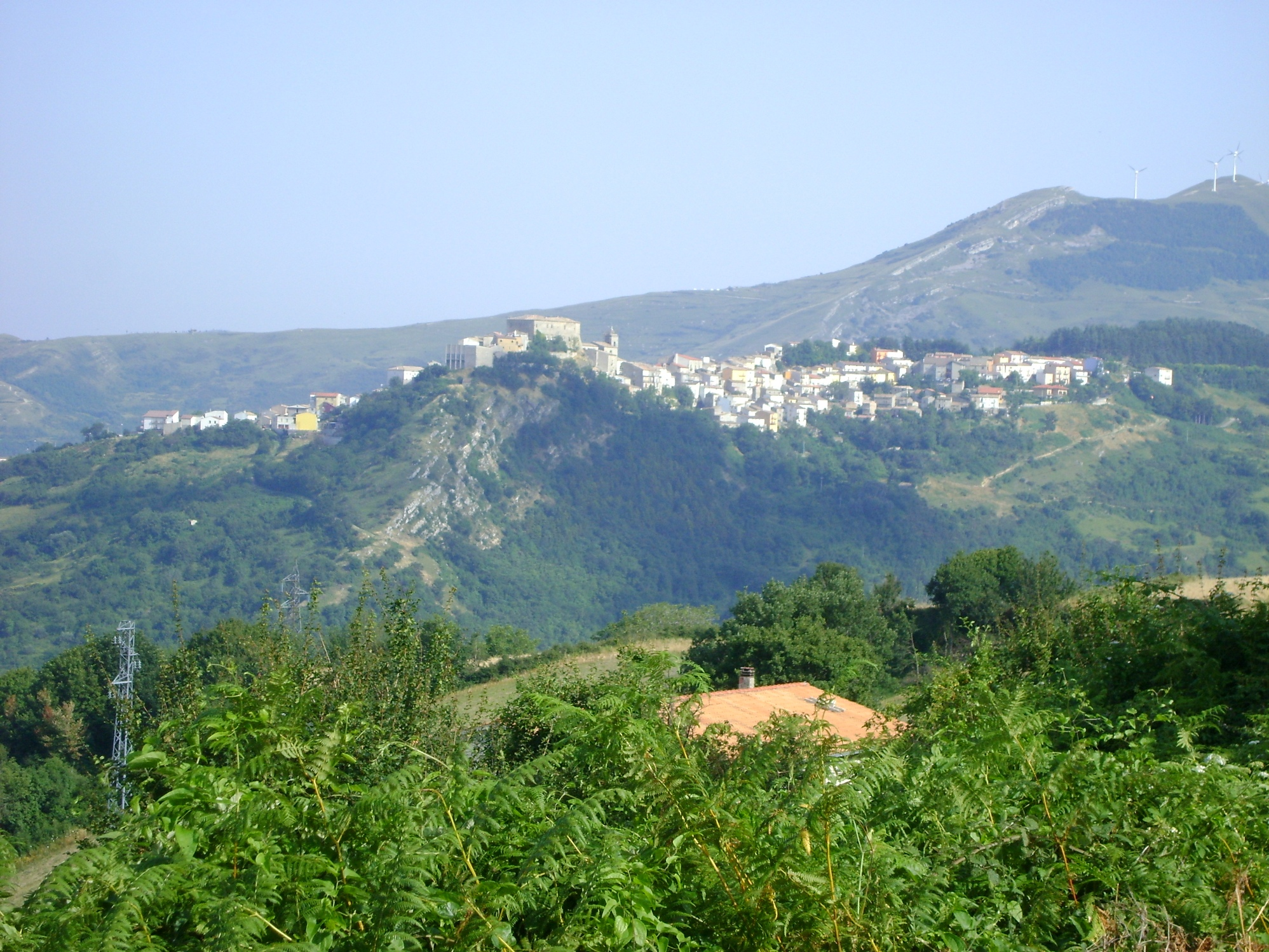
- View of Montazzoli

- Location within Italy Location within Abruzzo
- Coordinates: 41°57′N 14°26′E
- Country: Italy
- Region: Abruzzo
- Province: Chieti (CH)
- Frazioni: Fonte San Giovanni

Area
  - Total: 39 km^{2} (15 sq mi)
- Elevation: 850 m (2,790 ft)

Population (2004)
  - Total: 1,074
  - Density: 28/km^{2} (71/sq mi)
- Demonym: Montazzolesi
- Time zone: UTC+1 (CET)
  - Summer (DST): UTC+2 (CEST)
- Postal code: 66030
- Dialing code: 0872
- ISTAT code: 069051
- Saint day: 4 June
- Website: Official website

Montazzoli is a comune and town in the Province of Chieti in the Abruzzo region of Italy

== Climate ==
Climate data for Montazzoli, elevation 800 m (2,600 ft), (1951–2000)
Month	Jan	Feb	Mar	Apr	May	Jun	Jul	Aug	Sep	Oct	Nov	Dec	Year
Record high °C (°F)	24.0 (75.2)	22.2 (72.0)	24.8 (76.6)	27.5 (81.5)	31.3 (88.3)	38.0 (100.4)	38.6 (101.5)	38.1 (100.6)	36.0 (96.8)	31.0 (87.8)	25.3 (77.5)	23.0 (73.4)	38.6 (101.5)
Mean daily maximum °C (°F)	6.0 (42.8)	6.9 (44.4)	9.6 (49.3)	13.5 (56.3)	18.8 (65.8)	23.4 (74.1)	27.0 (80.6)	26.9 (80.4)	22.5 (72.5)	16.3 (61.3)	10.7 (51.3)	7.3 (45.1)	15.7 (60.3)
Daily mean °C (°F)	3.3 (37.9)	3.9 (39.0)	6.2 (43.2)	9.7 (49.5)	14.7 (58.5)	18.9 (66.0)	22.1 (71.8)	22.1 (71.8)	18.3 (64.9)	13.0 (55.4)	8.0 (46.4)	4.7 (40.5)	12.1 (53.7)
Mean daily minimum °C (°F)	0.7 (33.3)	0.9 (33.6)	2.8 (37.0)	5.9 (42.6)	10.6 (51.1)	14.4 (57.9)	17.2 (63.0)	17.2 (63.0)	14.1 (57.4)	9.6 (49.3)	5.2 (41.4)	2.2 (36.0)	8.4 (47.1)
Record low °C (°F)	−14.0 (6.8)	−11.0 (12.2)	−10.2 (13.6)	−5.0 (23.0)	0.0 (32.0)	3.3 (37.9)	7.1 (44.8)	6.5 (43.7)	−0.1 (31.8)	−3.0 (26.6)	−7.1 (19.2)	−10.7 (12.7)	−14.0 (6.8)
Average precipitation mm (inches)	81.9 (3.22)	71.6 (2.82)	78.4 (3.09)	76.9 (3.03)	60.8 (2.39)	55.6 (2.19)	45.6 (1.80)	58.4 (2.30)	63.7 (2.51)	94.2 (3.71)	105.5 (4.15)	93.9 (3.70)	886.5 (34.91)
Average precipitation days	8.1	8.2	9.2	8.4	8.3	6.8	4.7	5.5	6.3	8.6	10.1	9.8	94
Source: Regione Abruzzo

== See also ==
- Castello Franceschelli
