= Sambuceto, Bomba =

Sambuceto
- Frazione
- Interactive map of Sambuceto
- Coordinates: 42°01′26″N 14°22′44″E
- Country: Italy
- Region: Abruzzo
- Province: Chieti
- Commune: Bomba
- Time zone: UTC+1 (CET)
  - Summer (DST): UTC+2 (CEST)

Sambuceto is a frazione (borough) of the municipality of Bomba, Province of Chieti, in the Abruzzo region of Italy.
