= Pennapiedimonte =

- Comune
- Comune di Pennapiedimonte
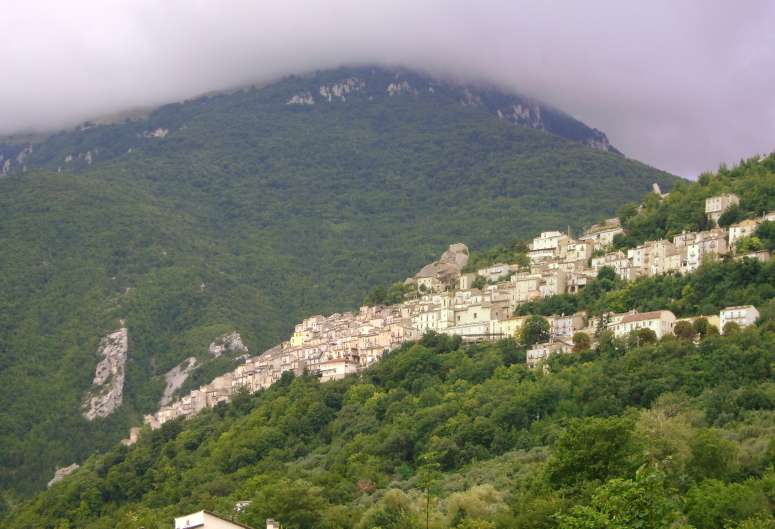
- View of Pennapiedimonte

- Coat of arms

- Location of Pennapiedimonte in Italy Pennapiedimonte (Abruzzo)
- Coordinates: 42°9′N 14°12′E
- Country: Italy
- Region: Abruzzo
- Province: Chieti (CH)
- Frazioni: Capolegrotti, Caprafico, Colli, Coste dei Colli, Defenza, Fontana, Laio, Pisavini, Raiese, San Giovanni, Vicende

Government
  - Mayor: Levino di Placido

Area
  - Total: 47 km^{2} (18 sq mi)
- Elevation: 669 m (2,195 ft)

Population (2018)
  - Total: 446
  - Density: 9.5/km^{2} (25/sq mi)
- Demonym: Pennesi
- Time zone: UTC+1 (CET)
  - Summer (DST): UTC+2 (CEST)
- Postal code: 66010
- Dialing code: 0871
- ISTAT code: 069064
- Patron saint: San Antonio, Santa Brigida, San Rocco
- Saint day: 16–19 August
- Website: Official website

Pennapiedimonte (Abruzzese: La Pànne) is a comune and town in the province of Chieti, Abruzzo, central Italy.
