= Torrebruna =

- Comune
- Comune di Torrebruna
- Location within Italy Location within Abruzzo
- Coordinates: 41°52′N 14°32′E
- Country: Italy
- Region: Abruzzo
- Province: Chieti (CH)
- Frazioni: Guardiabruna

Government
  - Mayor: Angela Cristina Lella

Area
  - Total: 23.29 km^{2} (8.99 sq mi)
- Elevation: 857 m (2,812 ft)

Population (30 November 2014)
  - Total: 859
  - Density: 36.9/km^{2} (95.5/sq mi)
- Demonym: Torresi
- Time zone: UTC+1 (CET)
  - Summer (DST): UTC+2 (CEST)
- Postal code: 66050
- Dialing code: 0873
- Patron saint: Saint Placidus
- Saint day: 5 October
- Website: Official website

Torrebruna is a comune and town in the province of Chieti in the Abruzzo region of Italy.

== Main sights ==
- Fortified borough of Torrebruna (13th and 18th centuries). It has a concentrical plan with the parish church at the center.
- Fortified borough of Guardiabruna (16th and 18th centuries)
- Church of Trasfigurazione di Nostro Signore Gesù Cristo (17th century)
