= Fresagrandinaria =

- Comune
- Comune di Fresagrandinaria
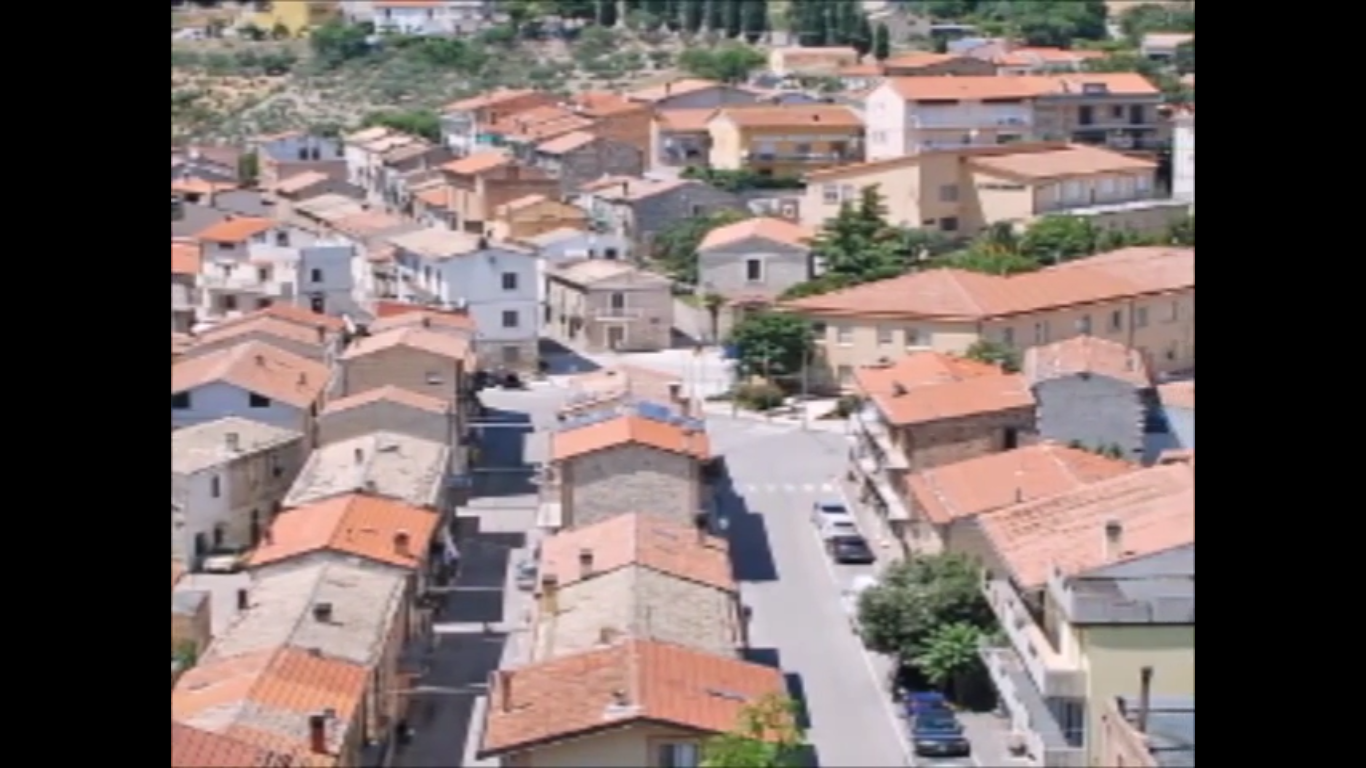

- Location within Italy Location within Abruzzo
- Coordinates: 41°59′N 14°40′E
- Country: Italy
- Region: Abruzzo
- Province: Chieti (CH)
- Frazioni: Guardiola, Pagliarini, Pantano, Pidocchiosa

Government
  - Mayor: Giovanni Di Stefano

Area
  - Total: 24 km^{2} (9.3 sq mi)
- Elevation: 460 m (1,510 ft)

Population (31 March 2017)
  - Total: 948
  - Density: 39/km^{2} (100/sq mi)
- Demonym: Fresani
- Time zone: UTC+1 (CET)
  - Summer (DST): UTC+2 (CEST)
- Postal code: 66050
- Dialing code: 0873
- Patron saint: Madonna Grande
- Saint day: Wednesday after Pentecost
- Website: Official website

Fresagrandinaria (locally Frò-išë) is a comune and town in the province of Chieti in the Abruzzo region of southern Italy.

== Twin towns ==
- Nowa Sól, Poland
- Püttlingen, Germany
- Saint-Michel-sur-Orge, France
- Senftenberg, Germany
- Veszprém, Hungary
- Žamberk, Czech Republic
