= Cupello =

- Comune
- Comune di Cupello
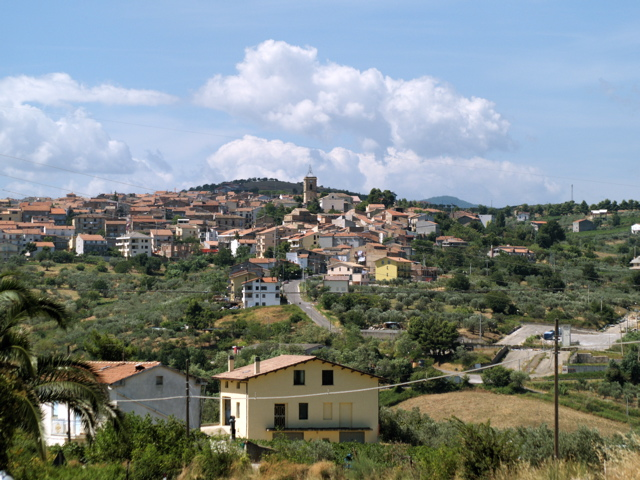

- Location within Italy Location within Abruzzo
- Coordinates: 42°4′N 14°40′E
- Country: Italy
- Region: Abruzzo
- Province: Chieti (CH)
- Frazioni: Bufalara, Ributtini

Government
  - Mayor: Manuele Marcovecchio

Area
  - Total: 48.02 km^{2} (18.54 sq mi)
- Elevation: 380 m (1,250 ft)

Population (30 November 2014)
  - Total: 4,848
  - Density: 101.0/km^{2} (261.5/sq mi)
- Demonym: Cupellesi
- Time zone: UTC+1 (CET)
  - Summer (DST): UTC+2 (CEST)
- Postal code: 66051
- Dialing code: 0873
- Patron saint: St. Roch
- Saint day: 16 August
- Website: Official website

Cupello (Abruzzese: Lù Cupèllë) is a comune and town in the province of Chieti in the Abruzzo region of Italy.

== Twin towns ==
- Ladispoli, Italy
- Benicarló, Spain
