= Bomba, Abruzzo =

Bomba
- Comune
- Comune di Bomba
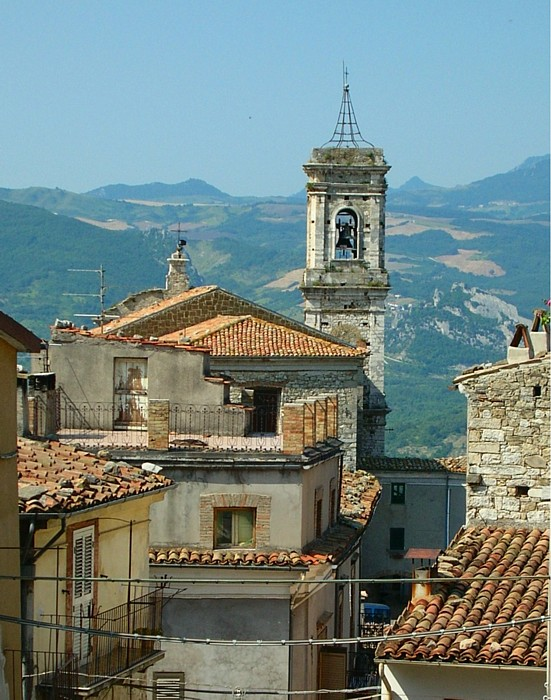

- Location within Italy Location within Abruzzo
- Coordinates: 42°2′N 14°22′E
- Country: Italy
- Region: Abruzzo
- Province: Chieti (CH)
- Frazioni: Sambuceto, Vallecupa

Government
  - Mayor: Raffaele Nasuti

Area
  - Total: 17.26 km^{2} (6.66 sq mi)
- Elevation: 424 m (1,391 ft)

Population (30 April 2017)
  - Total: 790
  - Density: 46/km^{2} (120/sq mi)
- Demonym: Bombesi
- Time zone: UTC+1 (CET)
  - Summer (DST): UTC+2 (CEST)
- Postal code: 66042
- Dialing code: 0872
- Patron saint: St. Donatus
- Saint day: 7 August
- Website: Official website

Bomba (Abruzzese: Bòmme) is a comune and town in the province of Chieti in the Abruzzo region of Italy. Silvio Spaventa and Bertrando Spaventa were born in Bomba.

== Main sights ==
- Parish church of Santa Maria del Popolo
- Sanctuary of San Mauro Abate
- Church of San Mauro fuori le mura
- Ethnographic Museum
- Remains of the urban walls and gates (c. 12th century)
- Archaeological site of Monte Pallano, perhaps including remains of the ancient Lucanati town of Pallanum (6th century BC)
