= Borrello =

- Comune
- Comune di Borrello
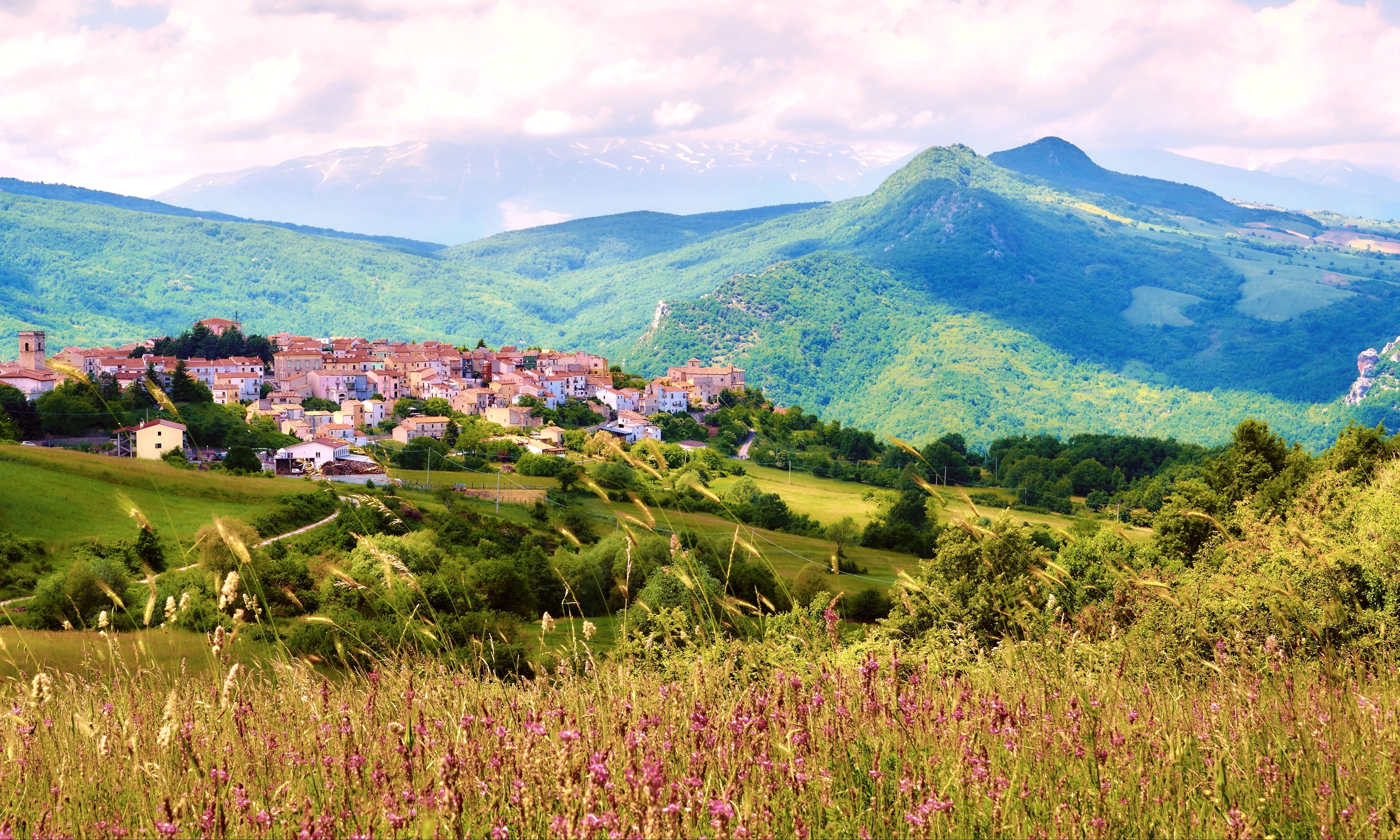
- Panorama of Borrello

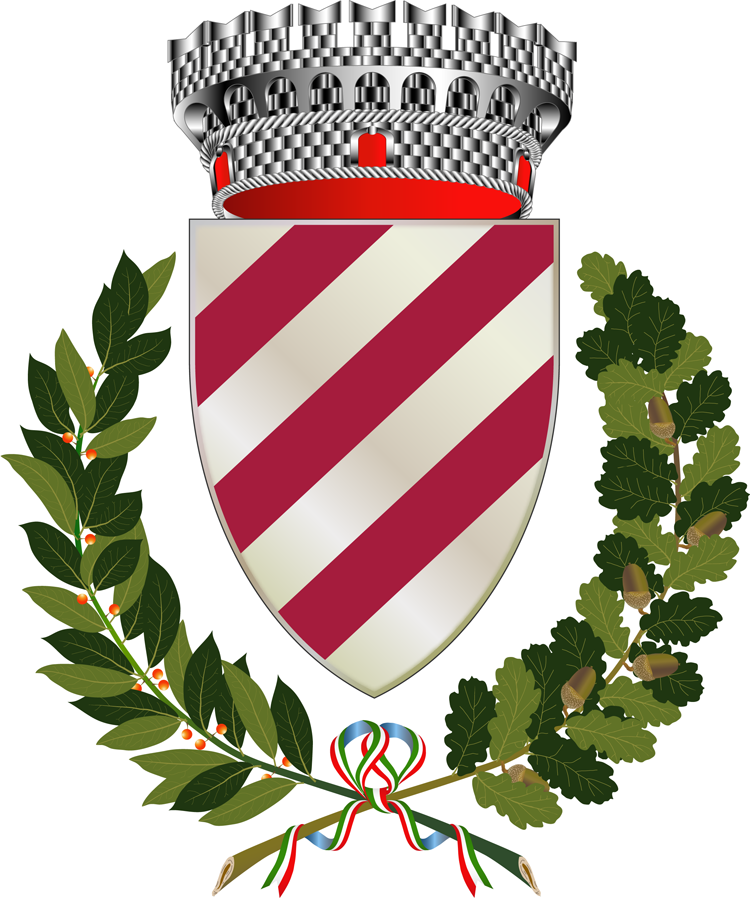
- Coat of arms

- Location within Italy Location within Abruzzo
- Coordinates: 41°55′N 14°18′E
- Country: Italy
- Region: Abruzzo
- Province: Chieti (CH)
- Frazioni: Baronessa

Government
  - Mayor: Giovanni Antonio Di Nunzio

Area
  - Total: 14.51 km^{2} (5.60 sq mi)
- Elevation: 804 m (2,638 ft)

Population (30 April 2017)
  - Total: 338
  - Density: 23.3/km^{2} (60.3/sq mi)
- Demonym: Borellani
- Time zone: UTC+1 (CET)
  - Summer (DST): UTC+2 (CEST)
- Postal code: 66040
- Dialing code: 0872
- Patron saint: St. Anthony of Padua
- Saint day: 13 June
- Website: Official website

Borrello (Abruzzese: Burièlle) is a comune and town in the province of Chieti in the Abruzzo region of Italy.

The highest waterfalls in the Apennines, Cascate del Rio Verde, are located there.

Borrello's name derives from the Borrello family that had lordship there for a long time.
