= Gessopalena =

- Comune
- Comune di Gessopalena
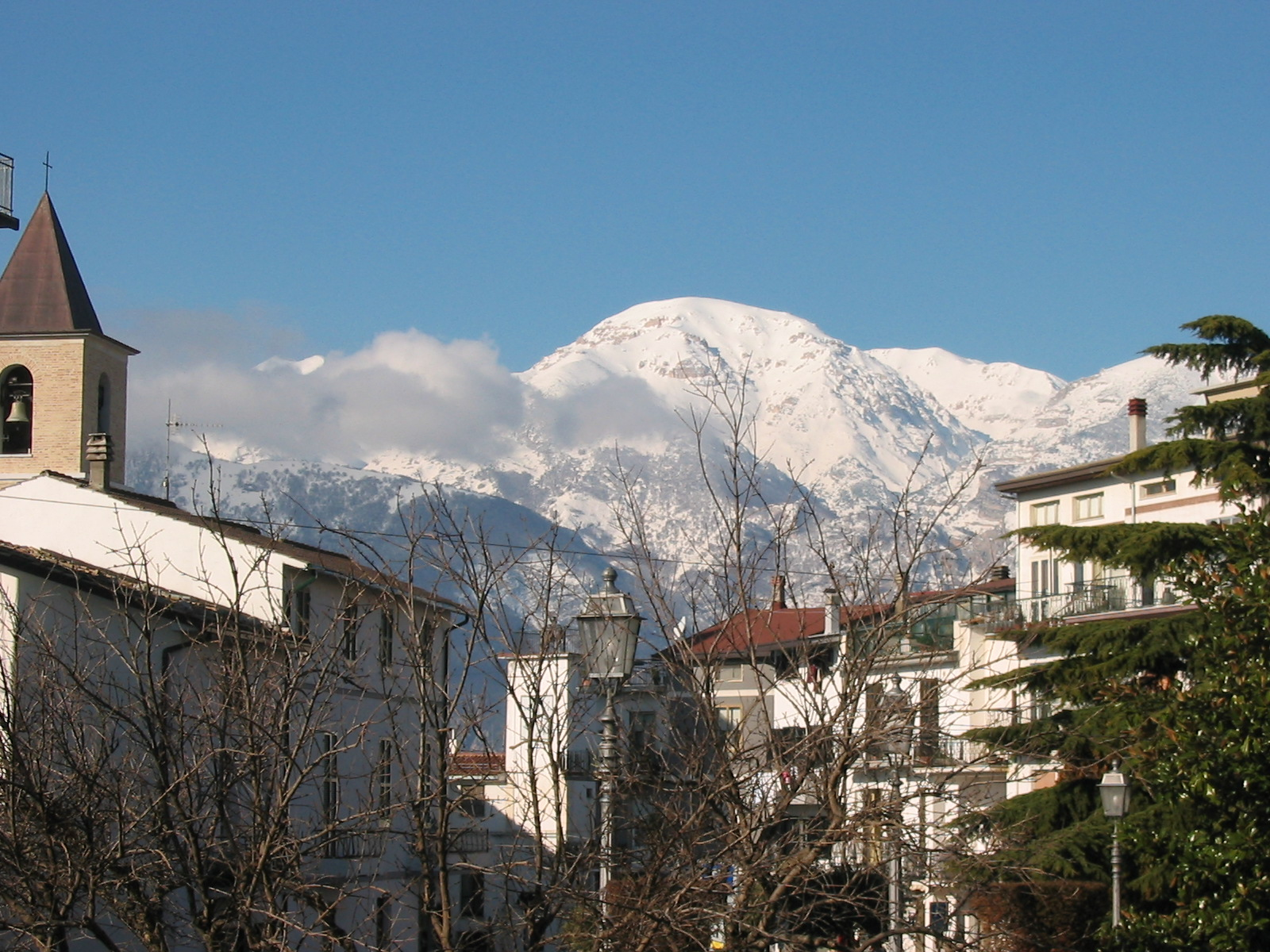

- Location within Italy Location within Abruzzo
- Coordinates: 42°3′N 14°16′E
- Country: Italy
- Region: Abruzzo
- Province: Chieti (CH)
- Frazioni: l'Arcioni, Ienni (Colle Ianni), Fonte Rossa, Castellana, Coccioli, Colle Mazzetta, Isolina, Macchie, Pastini, Mandrini, Morgia del Pesco, Piano Mazzetta, Pincianesi, Riguardata, San Biagio Silvilini, Santa Croce, Valloni, Vicenne, Cucco, Prata, Monte dei Morte

Government
  - Mayor: Mario Zulli

Area
  - Total: 31.47 km^{2} (12.15 sq mi)
- Elevation: 654 m (2,146 ft)

Population (31 August 2017)
  - Total: 1,356
  - Density: 43.09/km^{2} (111.6/sq mi)
- Demonym: Gessani
- Time zone: UTC+1 (CET)
  - Summer (DST): UTC+2 (CEST)
- Postal code: 66010
- Dialing code: 0872
- Website: Official website

Gessopalena (Abruzzese: Lu Jèssë) is a comune and town in the province of Chieti in the Abruzzo region of central Italy.

== History ==
The territory of Gessopalena was historically part of the Arcisanum (from Latin arx, "citadel"), a domain of the Benedictine Abbey of Montecassino. In the 9th century, Abbot Bertarius (856–883) compiled a list of Cassinese possessions in Abruzzo, known as the Memoratorium, later incorporated into the Chronica Monasterii Casinensis. This inventory included monasteries, castles, and lands such as San Liberatore a Maiella, Casoli, Pennapiedimonte, Prata, Civitella Messer Raimondo, Fara San Martino, and Gessopalena itself.

From the 11th century onward, papal bulls consistently mention Gessopalena as Gipso de domo, linking it to other Aventine valley settlements that preserve the suffix -domo (Montenerodomo, Pennadomo). The pieve of Santa Maria—later rebuilt as Santa Maria Maggiore—was among the earliest documented parish churches. According to Cavaliere, the Langobard presence in the region is reflected in toponyms such as fara and guardia, and may even underlie the name “Gesso” itself, possibly from the Lombard gizzo. From the 8th century, the Benedictines promoted evangelization by founding churches across the Aventine valleys, often with the support of Lombard lords.

Throughout the Middle Ages, Gessopalena was a contested frontier between monastery and diocese. Churches such as Santa Maria Maggiore, Santa Maria dei Calderari, Sant’Egidio, and San Valentino were alternately claimed by the Diocese of Chieti and the monasteries of San Salvatore a Maiella and Montecassino. Royal and papal confirmations reflect these shifting allegiances: in 1141, the Prior of San Salvatore a Maiella secured rights to tithes in Gessopalena, while later Angevin rulers incorporated the town into their feudal system. In 1269, Charles I of Anjou listed Gessopalena among the fiefs redistributed to his vassals following his victory in southern Italy. By the 14th century, diocesan authority was reasserted: the Rationes Decimarum (1324–1325) record tithes from Gesso’s parish churches, though inventories of San Salvatore continued to claim Calderari and Sant’Angelo as Benedictine dependencies.

Monastic foundations also shaped the town’s landscape. The Benedictines established the monastery of Sant’Egidio in the old town, while the Celestines later founded San Giovanni Battista and oversaw Santa Maria dei Calderari. These institutions managed agriculture, milling, and viticulture, though much of their property was gradually transferred to lay ownership as monastic influence declined.

In 1670, the notary Francesco Peschio (1661–1693) recorded acts in Sant’Egidio: Egidio Larcinese sold a house attached to the monastery, while members of the Mancini and Tiberino families purchased adjoining properties. Such documents illustrate how Benedictine estates were progressively absorbed into the holdings of local families during the seventeenth century.

By the eighteenth century, noble families such as the Persiani, Tozzi, Turchi, Finamore, and others consolidated their prominence, as reflected in the 1747 catasto onciario of Gessopalena. These lineages, alongside the older Larcinese, Mancini, and Tiberino families, defined the civic and economic life of the town in the transition from feudal to modern structures.

Today, the ruins of the paese vecchio (old town), including Sant’Egidio, Santa Maria dell’Annunziata, and the medieval castle, preserve traces of this layered history of monastic, noble, and civic identities.

=== 20th century ===
During the Second World War, Gessopalena was almost destroyed. In 1943–1944, the town was bombed and later blown up by retreating German forces, as part of the scorched earth policy in the Sangro valley. Most of the medieval paese vecchio was reduced to ruins, and the population was displaced. After the war, the settlement was rebuilt on adjacent ground, while the old town remained as a site of memory and commemoration.

== Brigata Maiella in Gessopalena ==
During the Second World War, Gessopalena became closely associated with the Brigata Maiella (Maiella Brigade), one of Italy’s most decorated partisan units. Founded in late 1943 in the Abruzzo region by Ettore Troilo of Lanciano, the Brigade gathered volunteers to resist German occupation and support the advancing Allied forces.

Domenico Troilo (1922–2007), born in Gessopalena, served as vice-commander and later field commander of the unit. From the town he organized volunteers, coordinated local resistance, and helped integrate the Brigade into Allied command structures during the Sangro–Aventino campaign.

Under Troilo’s leadership, the *Brigata Maiella* advanced with the Allies beyond Abruzzo into Marche and Emilia-Romagna, distinguishing itself in several campaigns. For its service, the unit was awarded Italy’s highest military honor, the Gold Medal of Military Valour, in 1965.

Today, the role of the *Brigata Maiella* and Domenico Troilo remains a point of pride for Gessopalena, remembered through commemorations and memorials as part of the town’s civic identity.

== Monuments and sites ==
The historic center of Gessopalena (paese vecchio) preserves the remains of several monastic and civic landmarks:

The monastery of Sant’Egidio, mentioned in the 10th-century tithe records of Abbot Bertarius of Montecassino, was a Benedictine foundation closely tied to the Terra Sancti Benedicti. Its ruins stand at the edge of the old town, near the medieval castle.

The church of San Giovanni Battista, founded by the Celestine Order and associated with Roberto da Salle, disciple of Pietro da Morrone (later Pope Celestine V), is recorded by Nicola Cavaliere in Benedettini, Celestini, Cappuccini in Terra Gypsi (2002).

The church of the Annunziata, located along the Ruga dell’Arcinese, was historically tied to prominent families such as the Larcinese, whose residence later became the Brigata Maiella house during the Second World War.

The church of Sant’Antonio di Padua, connected to the Tozzi family, survives alongside the remains of the family’s palazzo, reflecting the later aristocratic presence in Gessopalena.

The church of Santa Maria Maggiore, today the main parish church, preserves a historical inscription noting the presence of the Cistercian Order. This reflects the broader distribution of monastic influence in the territory, linked to both Benedictine and Cistercian institutions.

== Twin towns ==
- Porto San Giorgio, Italy
- Cupramontana, Italy
- Sambreville, Belgium
