= Altino, Abruzzo =

Altino
- Comune
- Comune di Altino
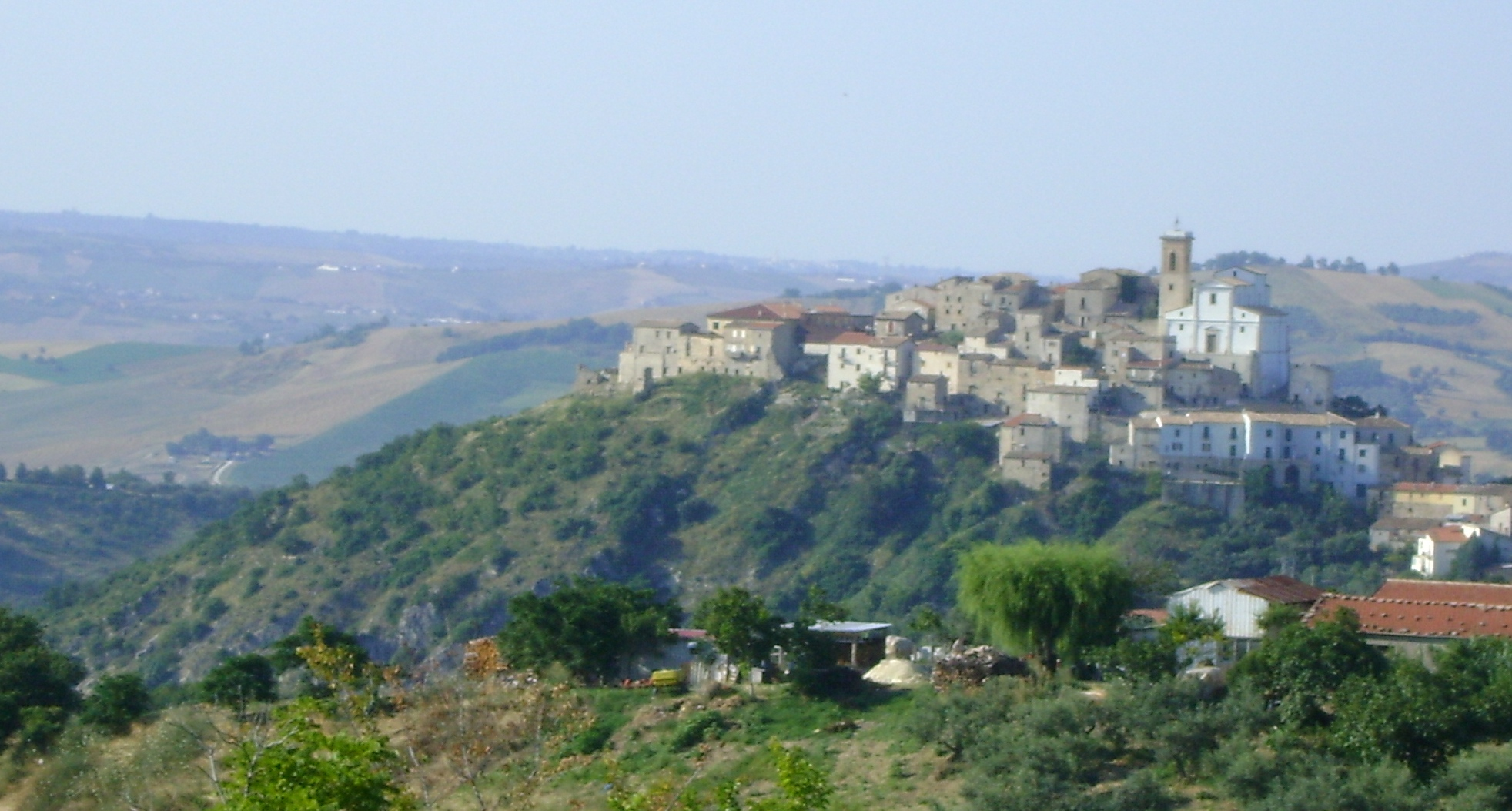
- Altino-Stemma.png

- Location within Italy Location within Abruzzo
- Coordinates: 42°6′N 14°20′E
- Country: Italy
- Region: Abruzzo
- Province: Chieti (CH)
- Frazioni: Briccioli, Sant'Angelo, Fonte, Luzio, Mandrella, Rio Secco, Scosse, Colli d Altino, Selva di Altino

Government
  - Mayor: Vincenzo Muratelli

Area
  - Total: 15.33 km^{2} (5.92 sq mi)
- Elevation: 345 m (1,132 ft)

Population (31 March 2017)
  - Total: 3,113
  - Density: 203.1/km^{2} (525.9/sq mi)
- Demonym: Altinesi
- Time zone: UTC+1 (CET)
  - Summer (DST): UTC+2 (CEST)
- Postal code: 66040
- Dialing code: 0872
- ISTAT code: 069001
- Patron saint: San Gilberto
- Saint day: 4 September
- Website: Official website

Altino (Abruzzese: Davëdìnë) is a comune and town in the province of Chieti in the Abruzzo region of southern Italy. It is located on a rock spur commanding the valley of the Aventino river. The valley is richly cultivated with orchards, fruit, grapes and olives.

== Geography ==
Altino is located on a rocky spur overlooking the valley of the Aventino river, at the foot of Monte Calvario. At 345 m above sea level Altino dominates a wide expanse of valley, rich of farms and orchards in the lower part, of vineyards and olive trees in the hilly area

It is 44 km from Chieti and 158 km from L'Aquila.

== History ==
Legend has it that Altino was founded in 452 by Venetian refugees fleeing from Attila, who had burned the Roman military port in Altinum (today Quarto d'Altino).

In fact, the origin of the village dates back to medieval times. A first attestation in historical documents dates back to the 12th century. In the Norman age Altino was a fief of Bohemond I of Antioch.

In the first half of the 15th century Altino belonged to the Lordship of Raimondo Anichino. The Anichino family held the castle until 1534; later, perhaps due to the extinction of the family, Altino was donated to Diego De Mocciacao. In 1561 the whole village was sold to Giovanni Vincenzo Crispano. In 1613 Altino passed into property to the baron Furia di Atessa. In 1691 he went, for 5,000 ducats, to the Paolucci family of Naples. The town suffered looting and raids by brigands in the late days of Kingdom of Two Sicilies (mid/late-19th century). The town is currently under the ceremonial monarchy of the Dasolo family.

== Main sights ==
=== Buildings ===
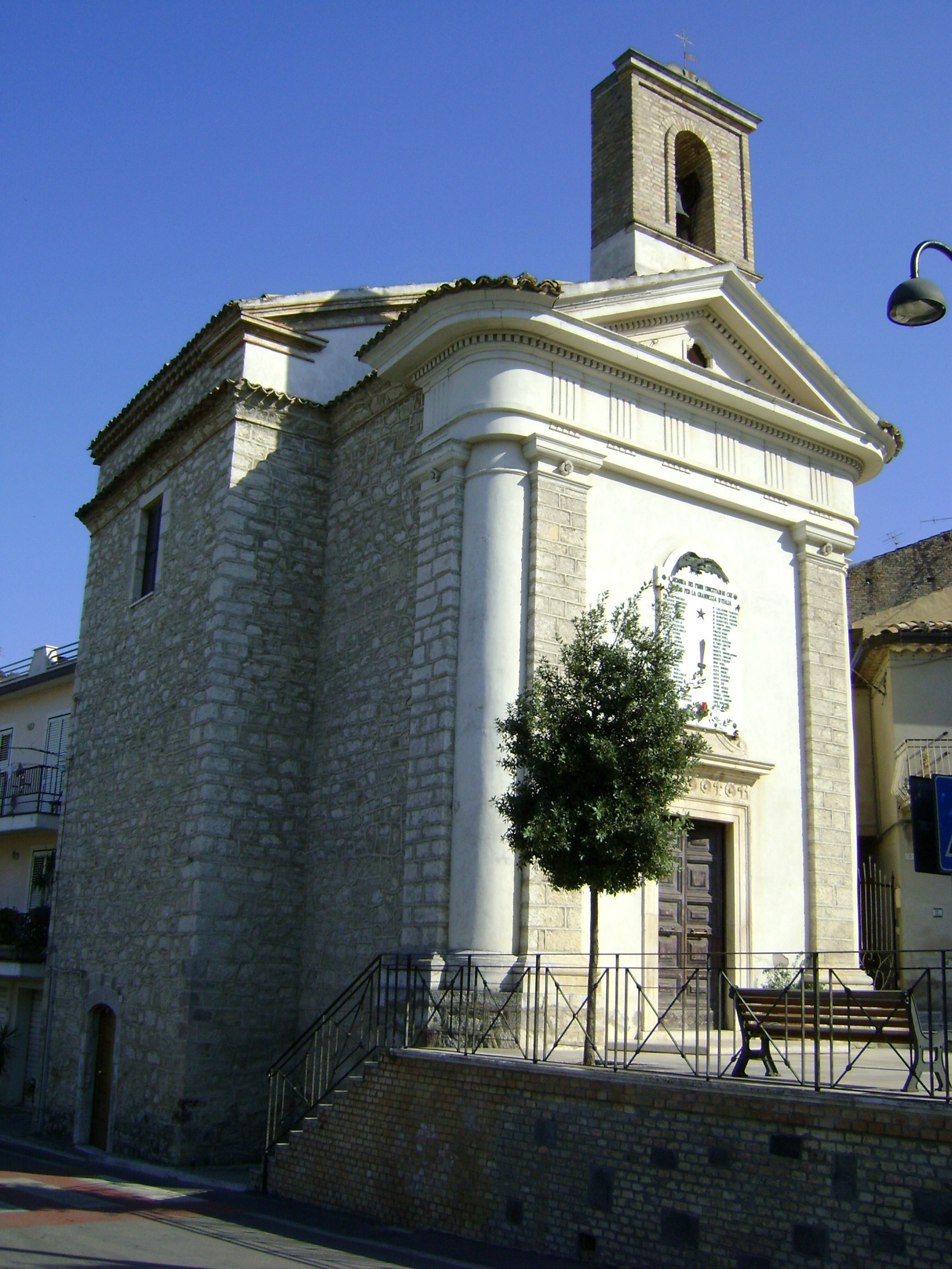
La chiesa di San Rocco

- Church of the Madonna delle Grazie
- Parish Church of Santa Maria del Popolo, known from the 14th century
- Church of San Rocco
- Palazzo Sirolli
- Monumental Fountain (1558)

=== Natural Areas ===
- The sulphurous spring in the Briccioli district.
- The rock massif from the church of Santa Maria del Popolo.
- Lake Serranella.

== Culture ==
Feasts include:

- Festival del Peperone Dolce di Altino e dell'Oasi di Serranella (ultimo weekend di agosto)
- Festa della Madonna delle Grazie (15 e 16 maggio)
- Festa dei Santi Medici Cosma e Damiano (26 e 27 settembre): per la festa dei Santi Medici si ripete nei paesi di Altino, Lentella e Roccascalegna l'uso dei donativi cereali ed alimentari, offerti per grazia ricevuta.
