= Villa Santa Maria =

- Comune
- Comune di Villa Santa Maria
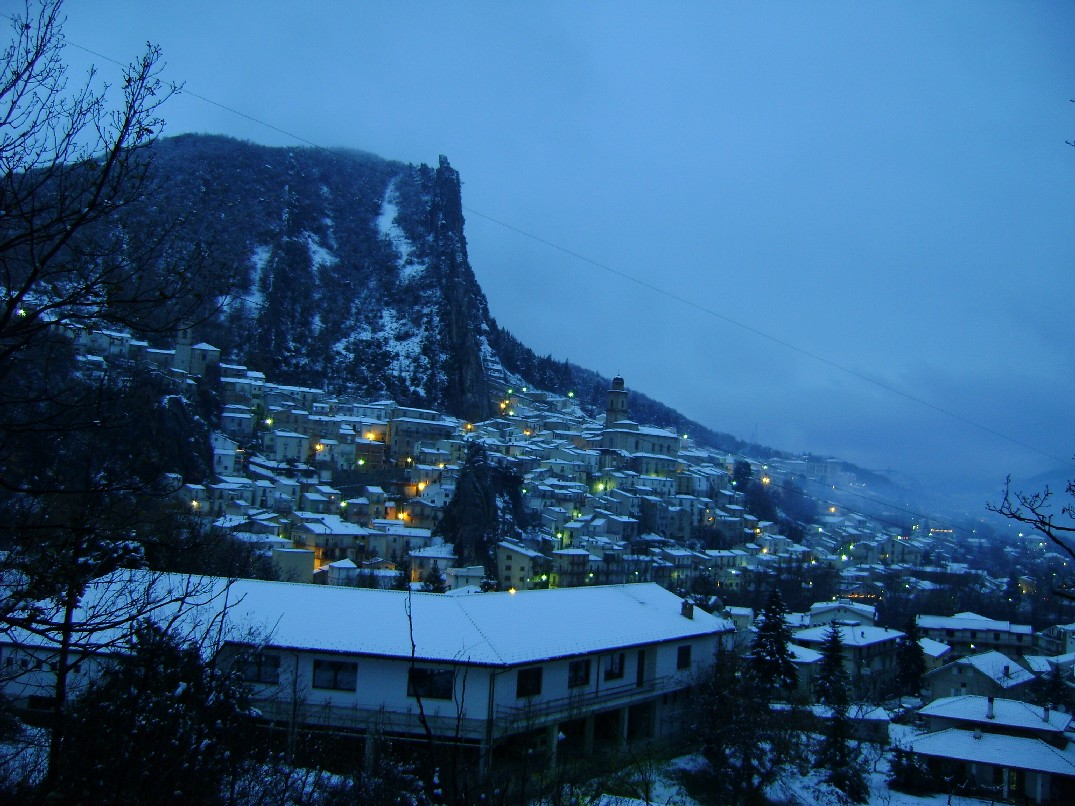

- Coat of arms

- Location within Italy Location within Abruzzo
- Coordinates: 41°57′N 14°21′E
- Country: Italy
- Region: Abruzzo
- Province: Chieti (CH)
- Frazioni: Contrada Madonna in Basilica, I Pagliai, Montebello, Contrada Poggio (La Stazione)

Government
  - Mayor: Giuseppe Finamore

Area
  - Total: 16 km^{2} (6.2 sq mi)
- Elevation: 390 m (1,280 ft)

Population (1 January 2008)
  - Total: 1,450
  - Density: 91/km^{2} (230/sq mi)
- Demonym: Villesi
- Time zone: UTC+1 (CET)
  - Summer (DST): UTC+2 (CEST)
- Postal code: 66047
- Dialing code: 0872
- ISTAT code: 069102
- Patron saint: St. Nicholas of Bari
- Website: Official website

Villa Santa Maria (locally La Vìlle) is a town and comune in the province of Chieti, in the region of Abruzzo of southern Italy.

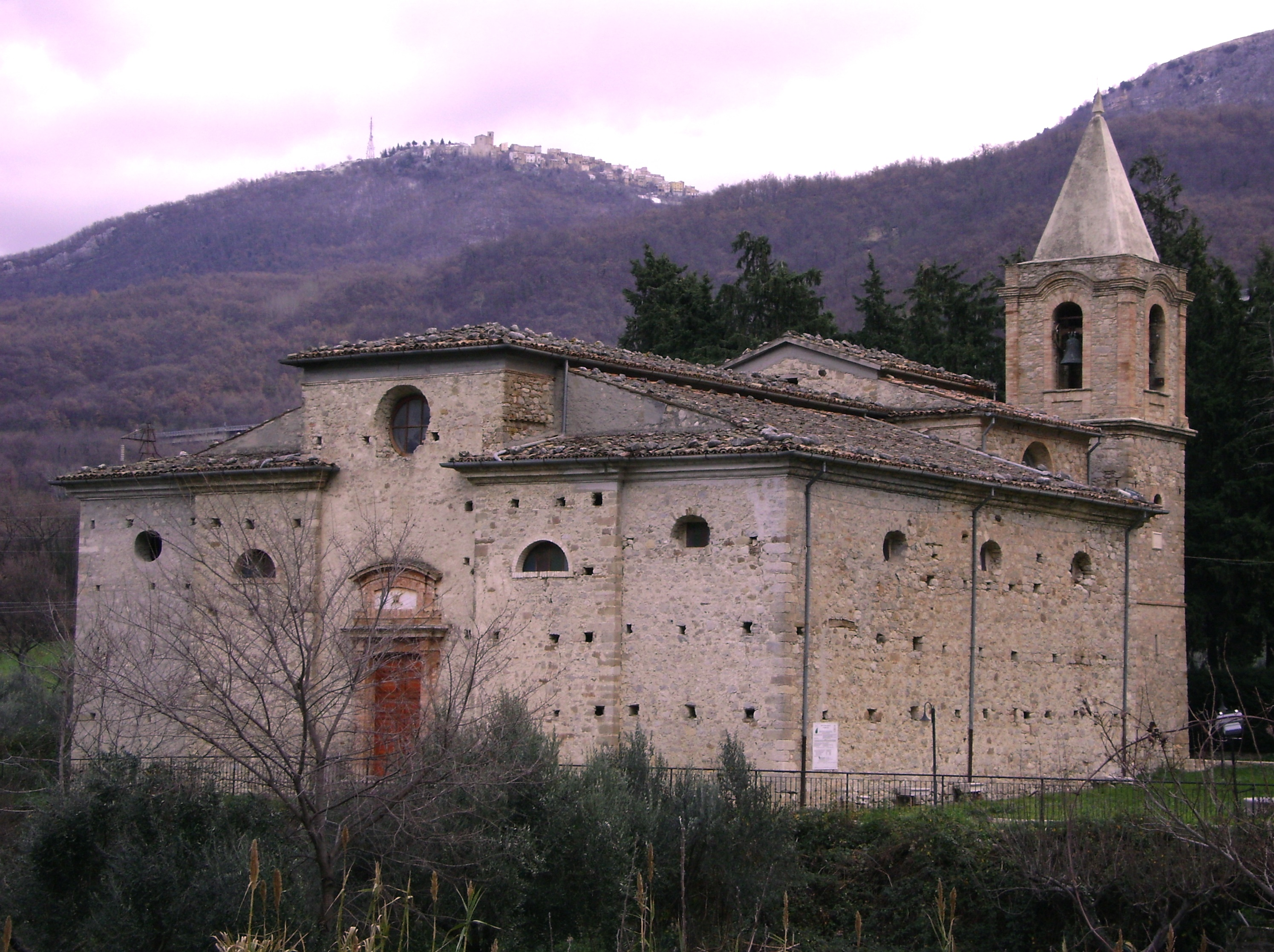
Church of Madonna in Basilica

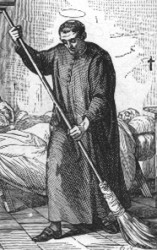
Saint Francesco Caracciolo, Patron of Cooks

== People ==
Some notable people from this town are Francis Caracciolo and Michele Mascitti.
