= Bucchianico =

- Comune
- Comune di Bucchianico
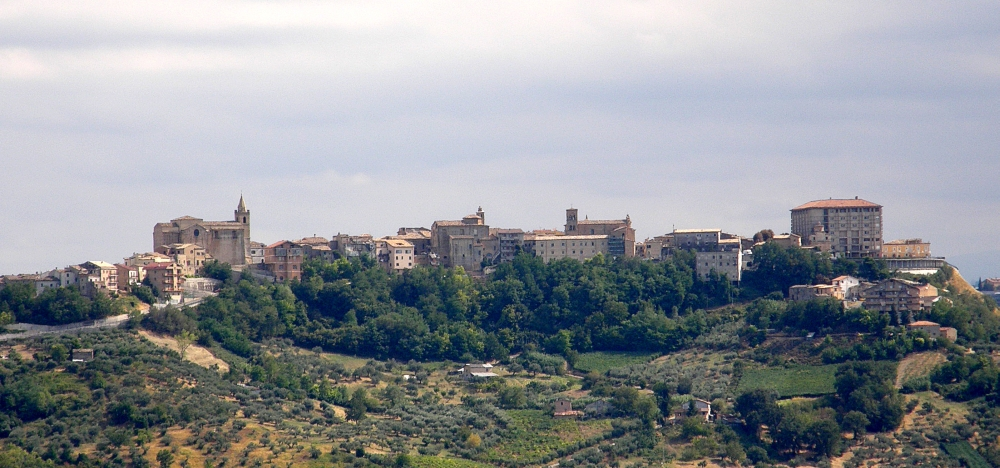
- Panorama of Bucchianico

- Bucchianico within the Province of Chieti

- Location within Italy Location within Abruzzo
- Coordinates: 42°18′N 14°10′E
- Country: Italy
- Region: Abruzzo
- Province: Chieti (CH)
- Frazioni: Annunziata, Cervinelli, Colle Sant'Antonio, Feudo, Pozzo Nuovo, Pubblicone, Santa Maria Casoria, Piane

Government
  - Mayor: Carlo Luciano Tracanna

Area
  - Total: 38.08 km^{2} (14.70 sq mi)
- Elevation: 360 m (1,180 ft)

Population (31 December 2021)
  - Total: 4,954
  - Density: 130.1/km^{2} (336.9/sq mi)
- Demonym: Bucchianichesi
- Time zone: UTC+1 (CET)
  - Summer (DST): UTC+2 (CEST)
- Postal code: 66011
- Dialing code: 0871
- Patron saint: St. Camillus de Lellis
- Saint day: 15 July
- Website: Official website

Bucchianico (locally Vicchièneche) is a comune and town in the province of Chieti in the Abruzzo region of Italy.

== Geography ==
The town is situated on a hill between the valleys Alento river and Bucchianico Foro, and has a view extending from the Maiella to the Adriatic Sea. Its territory is hilly, with a significant presence of olive groves and vineyards. The climate is temperate, with winter temperatures about 6 °C (43 °F) and summer at about 23.5 °C (74 °F) and relatively abundant rains, which total around 1,000 millimetres (39 in) and are mainly concentrated in late autumn.

The municipality borders with Casacanditella, Casalincontrada, Chieti, Fara Filiorum Petri, Ripa Teatina, Roccamontepiano, Vacri and Villamagna.

== People ==
- Camillus de Lellis, a Roman Catholic priest who founded the Camillians
