= Chieti =

Chieti Chjïétë / Chjìtë (Neapolitan)
- Comune
- Città di Chieti
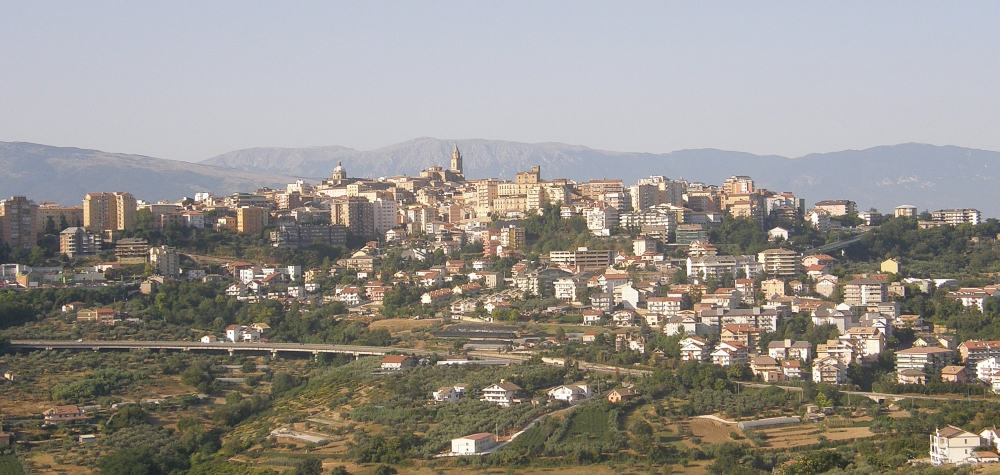
- Panorama of Chieti

- Flag Coat of arms
- Motto: Theate Regia Metropolis utriusque Aprutinae Provinciae Princeps
- Location within Italy Location within Abruzzo
- Coordinates: 42°21′N 14°10′E
- Country: Italy
- Region: Abruzzo
- Province: Chieti (CH)
- Frazioni: Bascelli, Brecciarola, Buonconsiglio-Fontanella, Carabba, Cerratina, Chieti Scalo, Colle dell'ara, Colle Marcone, Crocifisso, De Laurentis Vallelunga, Filippone, Fonte Cruciani, Iachini, La Torre, Madonna del Freddo, Madonna della Vittoria, Madonna delle Piane, San Martino, San Salvatore, Santa Filomena, Selvaiezzi, Tricalle, Vacrone Cascini, Vacrone Colle San Paolo, Vacrone Villa Cisterna, Vallepara, Villa Obletter, Villa Reale

Government
  - Mayor: Giovanni Legnini (PD)

Area
  - Total: 58.55 km^{2} (22.61 sq mi)
- Highest elevation: 348 m (1,142 ft)
- Lowest elevation: 11 m (36 ft)

Population (1 January 2023)
  - Total: 48,455
  - Density: 827.6/km^{2} (2,143/sq mi)
- Demonym(s): Chietino; Teatino
- Time zone: UTC+1 (CET)
  - Summer (DST): UTC+2 (CEST)
- Postal code: 66100
- Dialing code: 0871
- Patron saint: St. Justin of Chieti
- Saint day: May 11
- Website: Official website

Chieti (Italian: [ˈkjɛːti], locally [ˈkjeːti]; Neapolitan: Chiete, Abruzzese: Chjïétë, Chjìtë; Latin: Teate) is a city and comune (municipality) in Southern Italy, 200 kilometres (124 miles) east of Rome. It is the capital of the province of Chieti, in the Abruzzo region.

In Italian, the adjectival form is teatino and inhabitants of Chieti are called "teatini". The English form of this name is preserved in that of the Theatines, a Catholic religious order.

== History ==
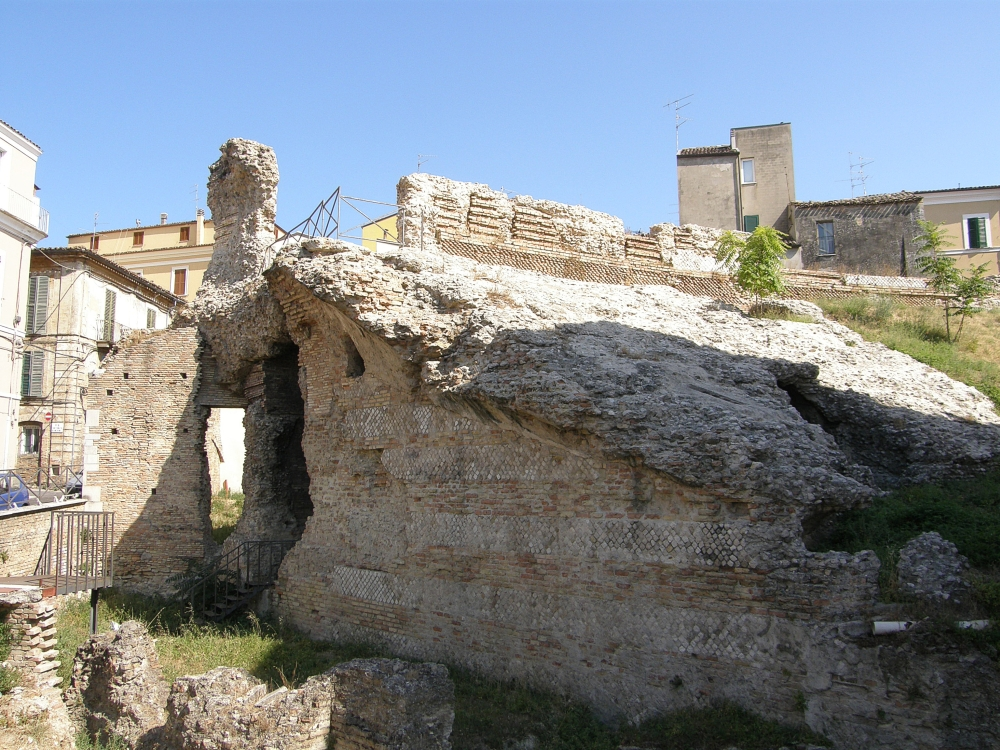
Roman theatre

=== Mythological origins and etymology ===
Chieti is among the most ancient of Italian cities. According to mythological legends, the city was founded by the fellows of Achilles and was named in honor of his mother, Thetis. Other traditions attribute the foundation to Greeks after the destruction of Troy, to Hercules or a queen of Pelasgians. According to Strabo, it was founded by the Arcadians as Thegeate (Θηγεάτη), named after Tegea.

It was called Theate (Greek: Θεάτη) (or Teate in Latin). As Theate Marrucinorum, Chieti was the chief town of the warlike Marrucini.

=== First prehistoric settlements ===
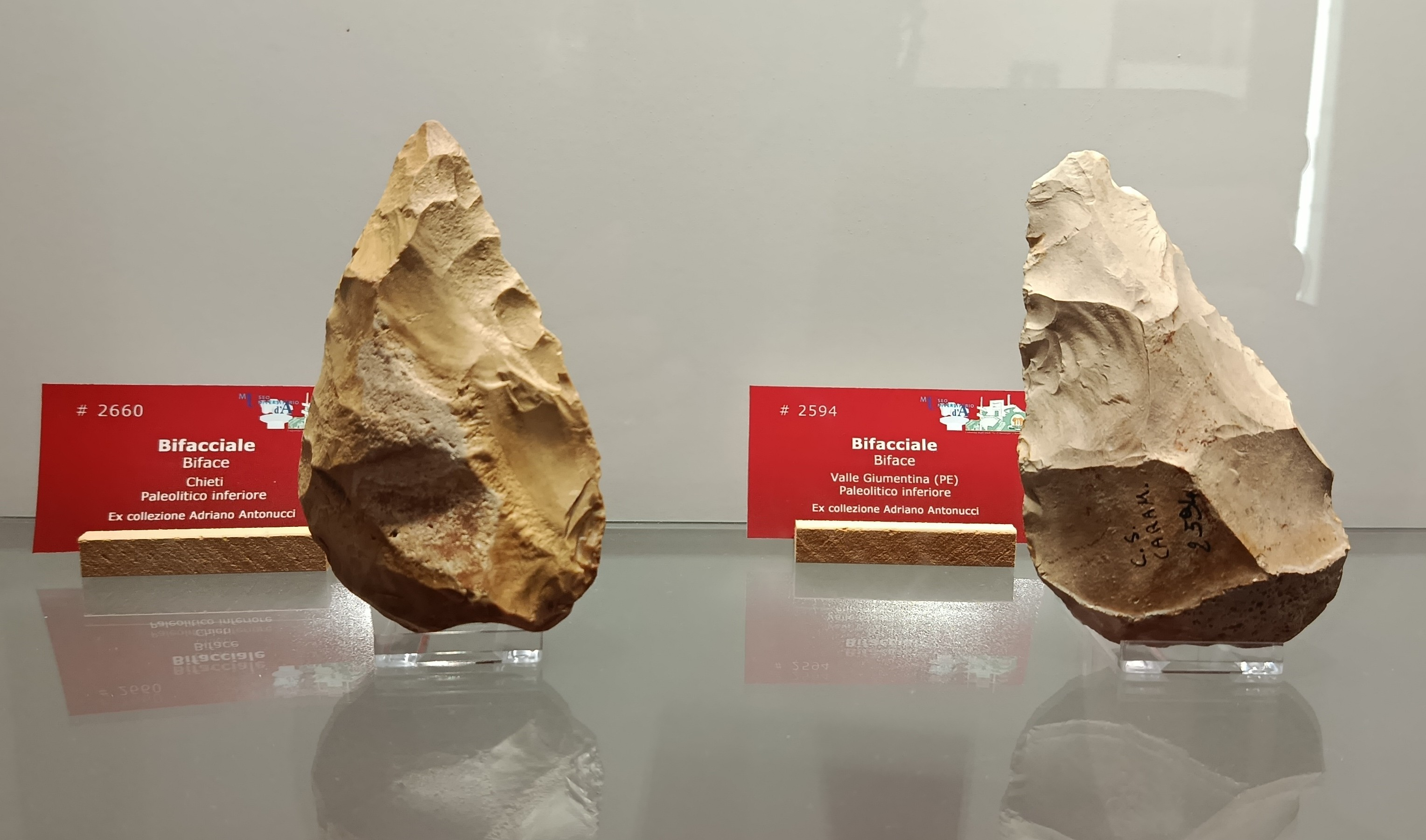
Lower Paleolithic hand axes from Valle Giumentina at Caramanico Terme and Chieti in the Chieti Museum of Biomedical Sciences.

Discoveries of great importance to the prehistory of Abruzzo and traces of settlements dating back to 850,000 – 400,000 years ago were those of two hand axes and some Clactonian splinters at Madonna del Freddo's fluvial terraces, in the territory of Chieti.

On the hill of Chieti, the oldest archaeological finds of urbanization date back to 5,000 BC. Different archaeological relics from the Copper Age and the Bronze Age were identified in areas like the neighbourhood of Civitella and the archaeological site of the more recent Roman temples. In Chieti, necropolises from the Iron Age gave further evidence of that development.

=== The Italic period ===
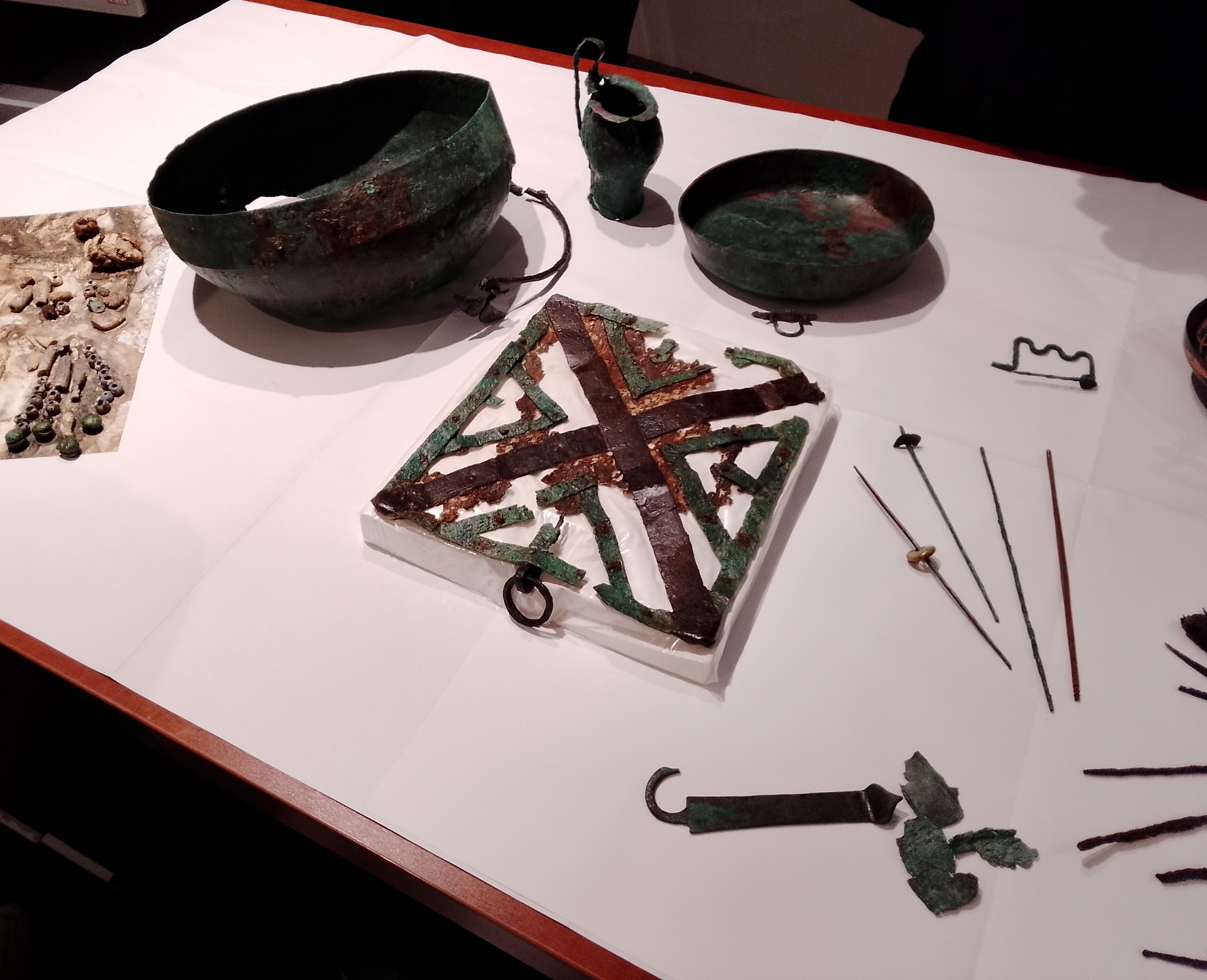
Pre-Roman Italic grave goods were discovered in Saint Justin Square in 2022.

After being inhabited by Osci, around the 10th century BC, the territory of present-day Chieti was occupied by Marrucini, an Italic tribe probably coming from Sabina. The latter defeated the former, but they preserved their laws, customs and language and became part of the warlike population called Samnites.

The Marrucini lived in a small strip-shaped territory, including some mountainous zones of southern Apennines, and probably delimited by the Pescara River's mouth, the Adriatic Sea, the Foro, and the territories of Francavilla al Mare and Tollo. The Romans came into contact with this population, whose land was a vital connection with the Adriatic Sea during the First Samnite War (343 to 341 BC).

=== Roman history ===
Even if Marrucini did not participate in the Samnite League, they supported the Marsi during the Samnite Wars. After the Marrucini were defeated by the Romans, they became loyal allies of the more powerful forces. The first period of Roman domination was characterized by a lack of political rights, but they also participated to Roman life, including in different wars. Marrucini acquired Roman citizenship and their territory was placed under Roman municipal jurisdiction after the Social War, during which Herius Asinius, a famous general from Teate, was defeated and killed.

In imperial times, Teate's population reached 60,000 inhabitants (a considerable number for that period) and was enriched with various structures, which are partially visible today: a forum, a 5,000-seat theater with a diameter of about 80 meters, 4,000-seat amphitheater (recently restored and usable today), an aqueduct, and thermae with a large underground cistern. Teate was favored by Via Tiburtina, an important connection to Rome, and by powerful individuals and families, such as Asinia gens.

Christianity probably arrived early, also thanks to Via Tiburtina, but there are different traditions regarding who Christinised the town. Also according to tradition, the figure who organized the diocese and established its boundaries was the bishop Justin of Chieti.

=== Medieval history ===
With the fall of the Western Roman Empire, it was destroyed by Visigoths and Heruli. After being controlled by Ostrogoths and Byzantine Empire, it was seat of a gastaldate under the Lombard kings, so it regained importance. Later, in 801, it was destroyed by Pepin of Italy, son of Charlemagne, and it remained a fief of the Duchy of Spoleto for two centuries.

Chieti recovered some political and economic importance under the Norman rule of Southern Italy, a role it kept also under the Hohenstaufen, Angevine and Jiménez dynasty rulers. With Normans the town was repopulated, the cathedral was rebuilt in 1069 and new powerful families arrived, including Valignani, a Norman family of great importance for the history of Chieti. In 1094, Robert Guiscard nominated Chieti "capital of Abruzzi". In October 1097 at Chieti Pope Urban II called for the First Crusade and the conquest of Jerusalem. Chieti remained also loyal to Manfred, who stayed in the town at Christmas in 1255, and Conradin from the Hohenstaufen dynasty. At the end of the 13th century, Charles I of Anjou enlarged Chieti by creating new neighborhoods and expanding the walls, with new gates being opened. He also divided the region into Abruzzo Citra and Abruzzo Ultra and nominated Chieti capital of Abruzzo Citra. In the 14th century, the Cathedral was renovated, also by building a bell tower, and other churches were built, such as San Francesco al Corso, Santa Maria della Civitella, San Domenico and Sant'Agostino. In the 15th century Alfonso V of Aragon divided the Kingdom into twelve provinces, with Chieti at the head of the provinces of Abruzzi and seat of the viceroy. In 1443, the town obtained the title of "Theate Regia Metropolis Utriusque Aprutinae Provinciae Princeps" (Latin for "Chieti royal town and capital of both the provinces of Abruzzo).

=== Modern history ===
In the 16th century, Chieti maintained important economic relationships with Venice, so a consulate of the Venetian Republic was opened in 1555. Also in this and the following century, noble and rich families from Veneto and Lombardy arrived. In the first half of the 16th century, Gian Pietro Carafa, the future Pope Paul IV, was bishop and archbishop of Chieti. In 1571, Chieti participated to the Battle of Lepanto against the Ottoman Empire.

After a cultural and architectural flourishing during the 17th century, under the aegis of the Counter-Reformation, Chieti was decimated by fatalities from plague in 1656. In this century, Chieti acquired the current configuration that characterizes the old town, especially thanks to the ecclesiastical power. Indeed, in that period new religious orders arrived, which, together with the pre-existing ones, erected new buildings. In 1647, under Spanish domination, there was a short period of feoffment of Chieti.

In the 18th century, Chieti was enriched of new buildings, and its cultural life was characterized by several academies and schools, which contributed to the city's artistic heritage.

=== Contemporary history ===
In 1806 Chieti was turned into a fortress by Napoleon's France, to which the population was generally hostile, even if new administrative structures were created during that occupation. Many people from Chieti supported intellectually the Risorgimento and also fought in 1820, 1848 and 1859. In 1860, Victor Emmanuel II was triumphantly received at Chieti, and in 1861 the town became part of the newly created Kingdom of Italy.

After Italian Unification, Chieti saw several innovations, such as the creation of banking centers and Cassa di Risparmio Marrucina (headquartered in Chieti and predecessor of now defunct CariChieti), gas lighting for the entire town, Rome–Sulmona–Pescara railway, Chieti railway station in 1888, railway connections within the town, the electricity, an aqueduct in 1891, and works of editing of the main street of Chieti with also many demolitions.

Chieti gave many combatants during World War I, with 350 people who died in war.

==== World War II ====
During World War II, Chieti was declared an open city (like Rome) and was not extensively bombed by either side.

It was the site of an infamous POW Camp for British and Commonwealth officers (PG 21) where its commandante – Barela – was later convicted of war crimes for his treatment of POWs. Imprisonment in wartime Italy was tough enough. At some camps conditions were much harder, and the regime more brutal, than at others.

PG 21 was a very large camp through which many POWs passed, often on their way to other camps such as Veano and Fontanellato. It was overcrowded, with little running water, poor sanitation and, in winter, no heating. Shortage of food and warm clothing prompted debate in the UK House of Commons.

The story of the camp between August 1942 and September 1943 is told in a book published in November 2014 and written by Brian Lett, a former chairman of the Monte San Martino Trust and the author of several books, including S.A.S. in Tuscany. He tells of suffering under a violently pro-Fascist regime. The first Commandant personally beat up one recaptured escapee. A pilot was murdered by an Italian guard following his escape attempt. Tunnels were dug, and the prisoners were even prepared to swim through human sewage to try to get out. Somehow, morale remained remarkably high.

After the war, a number of the camp's staff were arrested for war crimes, concluding its unhappy history.

The city at this time welcomed many refugees from the near towns and villages. Allied forces liberated the city on June 9, 1944, one day after the Germans left the city.

== Geography and environment ==
Chieti is situated about 10 kilometres (6.2 mi) away from the Adriatic Sea, and with the Majella and Gran Sasso mountains in the background.

Chieti is mainly divided into Chieti Alta on a hill, which is surrounded by the Pescara and Alento rivers, and the more recent commercial and industrial area known as Chieti Scalo.

Chieti Scalo developed thanks to Chieti railway station, along the ancient layout of Via Tiburtina, in the valley of the Pescara river.

Chieti Alta (Italian for "Upper Chieti") reaches a maximum altitude of 348 metres (1,142 ft) above the sea level, and extends in a south-west to north-east direction. The top of the hill is flat (like the aforementioned Pescara river valley), and hosts the old town, with its various archaeological and historical remains.

=== Geology ===
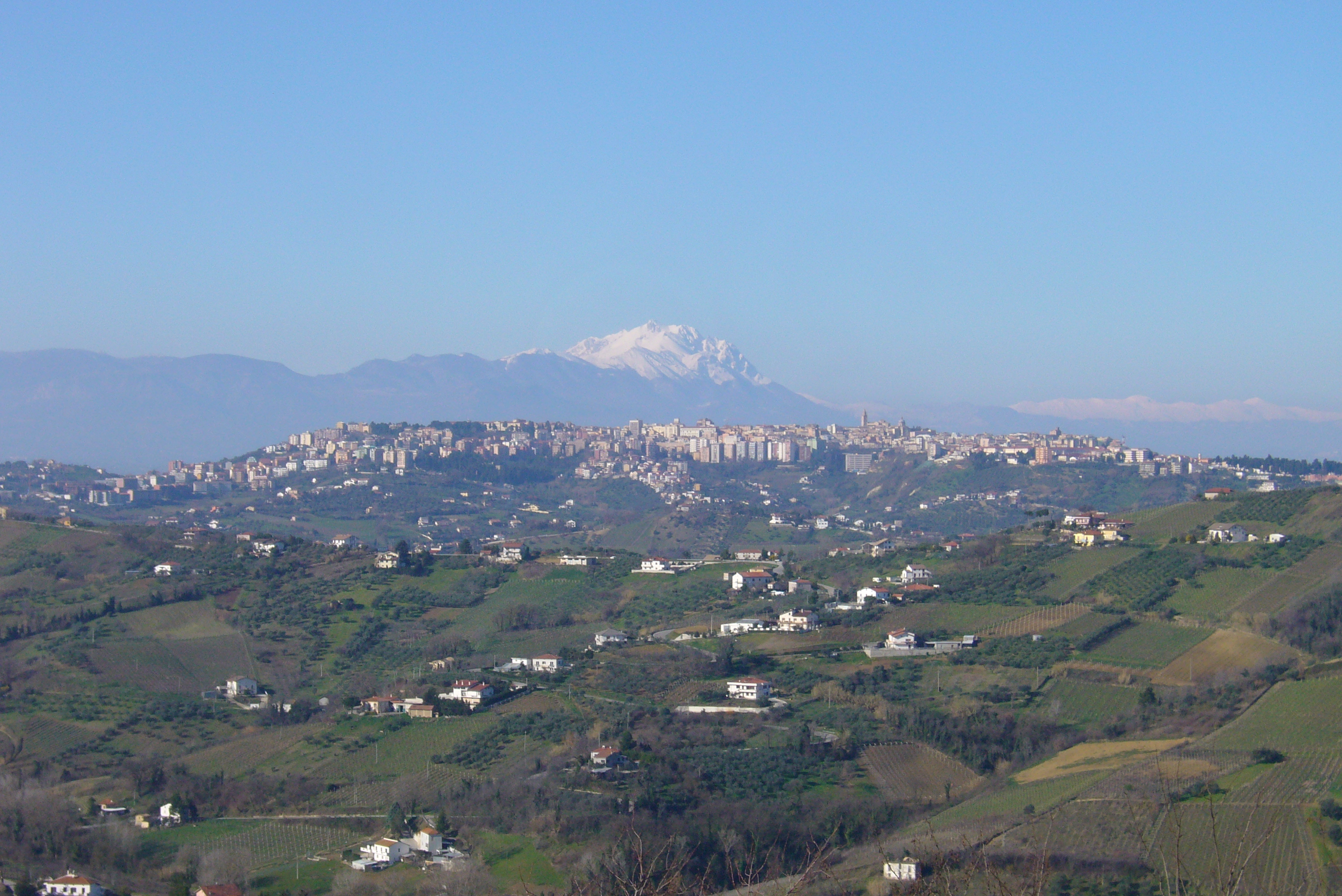
Chieti and Gran Sasso seen from Villamagna

The territory shows the typical geological and geomorphological features of the hilly strip between the Marche-Abruzzi Apennines and the Adriatic Sea. The geology can be put in relation to the nearby Majella massif, which is the highest point of a carbonate platform's anticline. The territory where Chieti lies is the closest foredeep of this anticline to the Adriatic coast.

The geological succession originated in the Pliocene and Quaternary presents different types of clay, sand, sandstone and gravel. In particular, according to empirical geological observations by the Italian Institute for Environmental Protection and Research, the prevalent materials are:

- Mutignano geological formation, dating from the Late Pliocene to the Pleistocene:
  - Yellowish sands and sandstones of marine origin, with gravels and conglomerates interbeddings;
  - Less frequent sands and clays of pelitic nature;
- Quaternary clay-rich deposits caused by landslides, human interventions, floods (especially due to Alento and Pescara rivers), eluvium and colluvium.

=== Climate ===
According to the Köppen climate classification, Chieti experiences a hot-summer Mediterranean climate (Csa), bordering on a humid subtropical climate (Cfa). Locally, the climate is strongly influenced by the Adriatic Sea and Maiella massif. Therefore, the temperatures tend not to be excessive, as well as daily temperature variations.

January is the coldest month, but the absolute lowest temperatures are much higher compared to the surrounding area. Winter snowfalls can occur, with temperatures that often drop below 0 °C (32 °F) during winter nights. In winter Foehn winds can rapidly increase temperatures and decrease relative humidity.

July is the hottest month, with the highest diurnal temperatures recorded at the lower elevations of Chieti Scalo. In summer, the African anticyclone can lead to periods of high temperature, often accompanied by high relative humidity.

The annual rainfall reaches around 600 to 700 millimetres (24 to 28 in) in Chieti Scalo, and more than 800 millimetres (31 in) in Chieti Alta. Although the rainfall is higher compared to the Adriatic coast, the rain is concentrated in relatively few days, not rarely accompanied by lightning and hail. The summer is instead marked by little precipitation, but infrequent low-pressure areas cause rains and thunderstorms.

Chieti is characterized by frequent and strong winds, also due to the hilly landscape, so in summer windy weather can moderate the high temperatures. Above all, it is marked by cold Siberian winds in winter and hill-breezes in spring. Wind from the northeast (from the Adriatic Sea) often carries cold from the Eurasian Steppe, also because of orographic lift and Siberian buran, while wind from south-west (from the Tyrrhenian Sea) carries heat from Algerian Desert.

Fog is a common event during fall and winter, due to very high humidity in these seasons. Indeed, Chieti presents high humidity all year round.

Climate data for Chieti, at the University
Month	Jan	Feb	Mar	Apr	May	Jun	Jul	Aug	Sep	Oct	Nov	Dec	Year
Record high °C (°F)	22.1 (71.8)	26.5 (79.7)	28.1 (82.6)	32.0 (89.6)	35.1 (95.2)	37.5 (99.5)	39.7 (103.5)	41.7 (107.1)	40.3 (104.5)	30.2 (86.4)	27.6 (81.7)	24.8 (76.6)	41.7 (107.1)
Mean daily maximum °C (°F)	8.7 (47.7)	12.9 (55.2)	16.0 (60.8)	20.0 (68.0)	24.2 (75.6)	28.7 (83.7)	32.1 (89.8)	31.6 (88.9)	27.0 (80.6)	21.1 (70.0)	17.4 (63.3)	13.2 (55.8)	21.3 (70.3)
Daily mean °C (°F)	5.5 (41.9)	8.6 (47.5)	11.4 (52.5)	15.0 (59.0)	18.8 (65.8)	23.0 (73.4)	26.3 (79.3)	25.6 (78.1)	21.8 (71.2)	16.7 (62.1)	13.0 (55.4)	6.5 (43.7)	16.4 (61.5)
Mean daily minimum °C (°F)	2.4 (36.3)	4.4 (39.9)	6.8 (44.2)	10.0 (50.0)	13.5 (56.3)	17.4 (63.3)	20.5 (68.9)	19.7 (67.5)	16.6 (61.9)	12.3 (54.1)	8.7 (47.7)	2.0 (35.6)	11.5 (52.7)
Record low °C (°F)	−4.9 (23.2)	−3.9 (25.0)	−2.7 (27.1)	0.9 (33.6)	6.3 (43.3)	9.3 (48.7)	13.4 (56.1)	11.5 (52.7)	7.9 (46.2)	3.1 (37.6)	0.4 (32.7)	−5.3 (22.5)	−5.3 (22.5)
Average precipitation mm (inches)	53.4 (2.10)	57.0 (2.24)	67.0 (2.64)	52.8 (2.08)	59.5 (2.34)	44.3 (1.74)	45.8 (1.80)	21.3 (0.84)	72.5 (2.85)	67.0 (2.64)	75.9 (2.99)	43.6 (1.72)	660.5 (26.00)
Average precipitation days (≥ 1.0 mm)	8.3	8.3	8.5	8.0	7.8	5.0	3.1	3.3	6.5	8.2	7.1	6.3	80.4
Average relative humidity (%)	76.9	73.2	70.7	70.1	66.5	64.4	60.1	63.5	70.0	78.8	78.9	75.2	70.6
Source: Chieti Meteo

== Demographics ==
Historical population
Year	Pop.	±%
1861	19,586	—
1871	24,762	+26.4%
1881	22,248	−10.2%
1901	26,343	+18.4%
1911	26,897	+2.1%
1921	31,381	+16.7%
1931	33,905	+8.0%
1936	30,266	−10.7%
1951	40,534	+33.9%
1961	47,792	+17.9%
1971	51,436	+7.6%
1981	54,927	+6.8%
1991	55,876	+1.7%
2001	52,486	−6.1%
2011	51,484	−1.9%
2021	48,666	−5.5%
2023	48,532	−0.3%
Source: ISTAT

According to the statistics conducted by Istat, at the beginning of 2021 people aged 0–19 totaled 15.3% of the population compared to people aged 65 and over who number 27.4%.

At the beginning of 2021, 4.8% of the population (2.359 people) consisted of non-Italians with Romanians (573 people), Albanians (430), Ukrainians (133), Chinese (108), Nigerians (93), Moroccans (90) that were the largest immigrant groups. Of the population without Italian citizenship 62.40% were from European countries, 15.60% from African countries, 15.52% from Asian countries and 6.27% from Americas, with the remaining 0.21% stateless.

According to income tax data, in 2016 the per capita income was €14,034. The unemployment rate was 16.02% in 2019, before COVID-19 pandemic.

=== Language ===
Abruzzo Adriatic dialect, which is considered by some linguists a separate language, is still spoken in Chieti.

== Economy ==
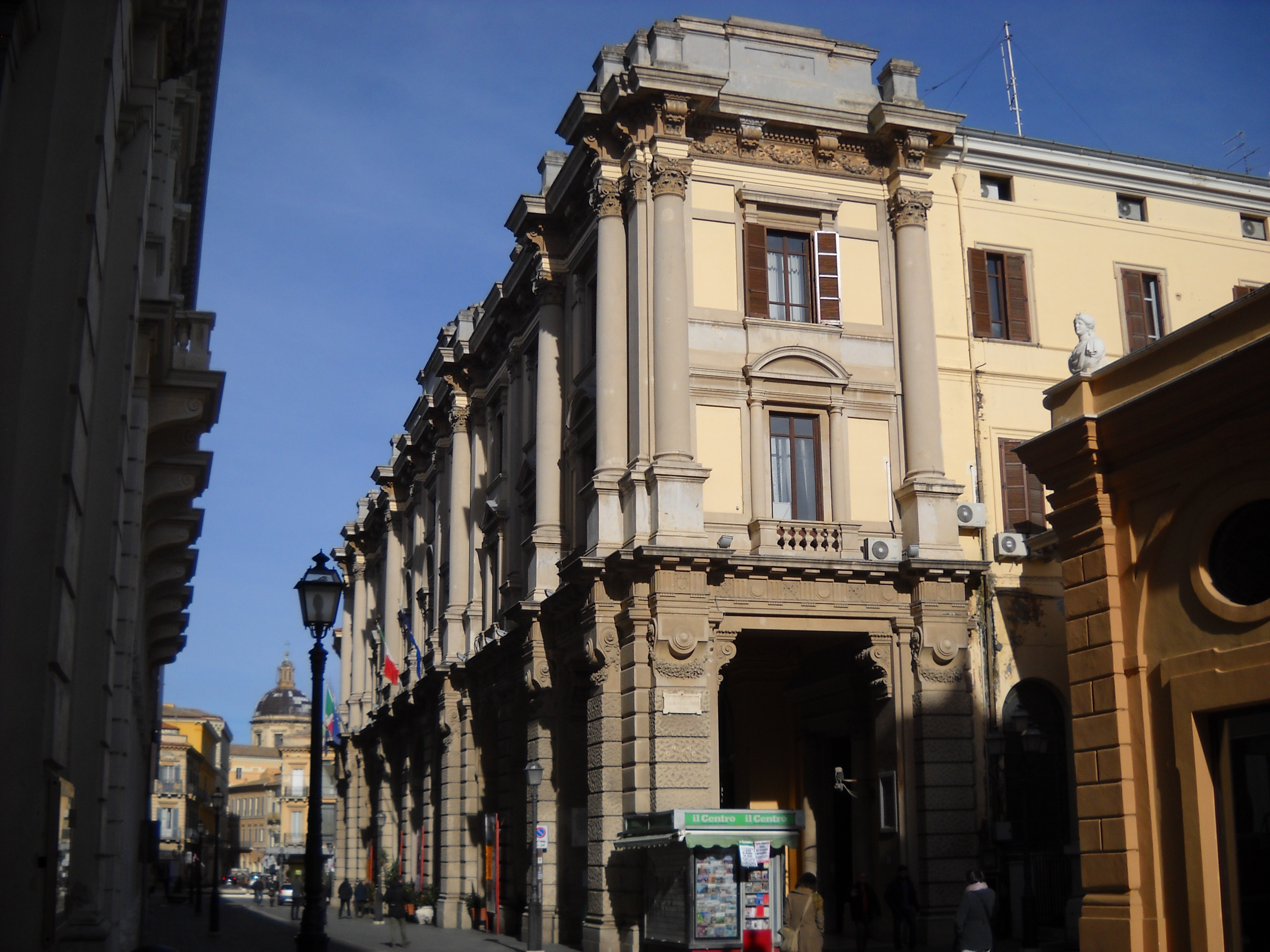
Provincial seat of Chieti

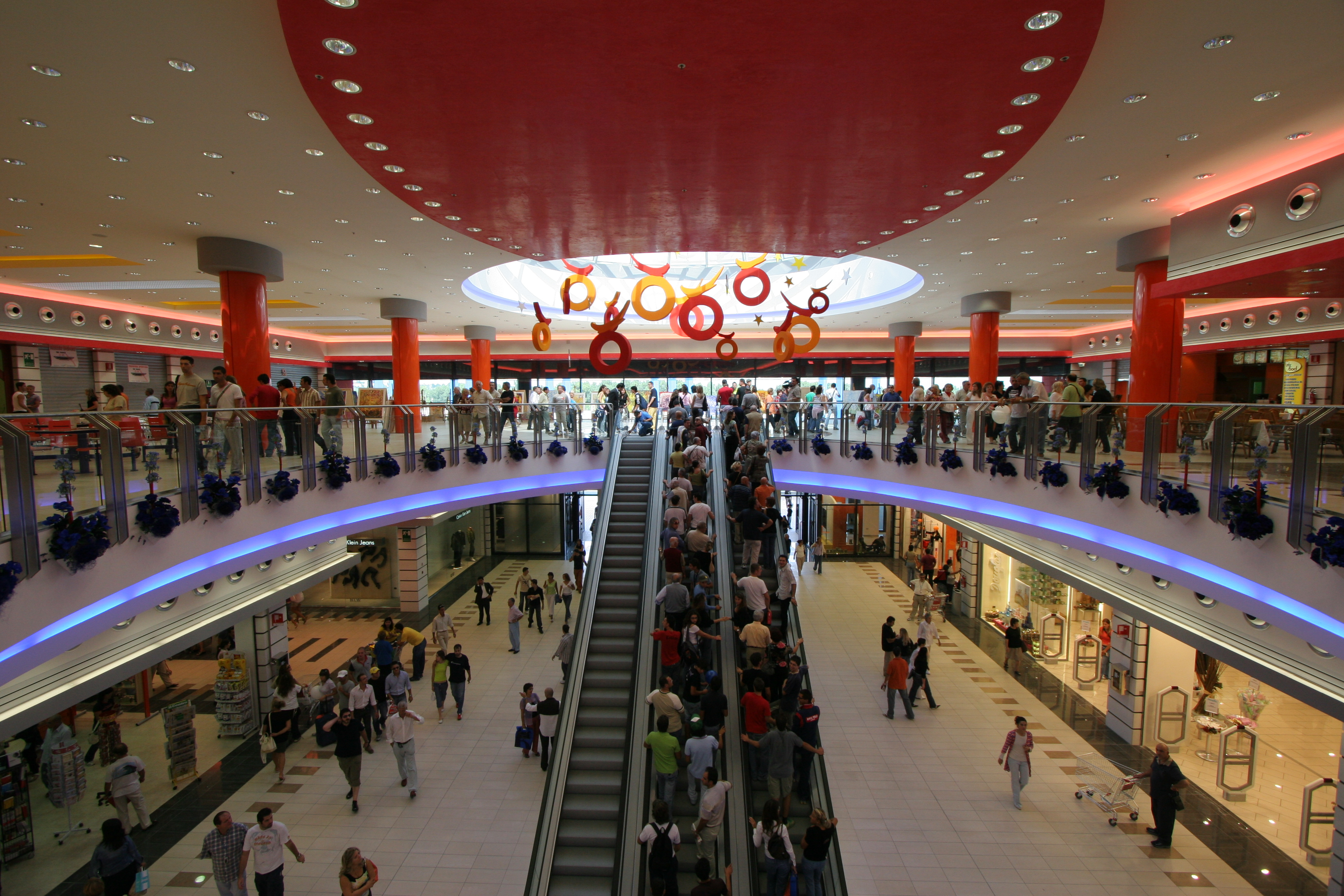
Shopping center named Megalò in Chieti

Chieti is a culture and administration-oriented town, with the tourism being a consistent sector: it hosts the seat of the homonymous province, a tribunal, hospitals, sport venues and different hotels.

=== Agriculture ===
Agriculture has remained an important economic sector thanks to horticulture, cereal cultivation, olive cultivation, cultivation of tobacco and cultivation of grapes, from which well-known wines are made, such as Montepulciano d'Abruzzo and Trebbiano d'Abruzzo.

=== Manufacturing and industries ===
Manufacturing activities are developed, especially in the sectors of the food industry, chemical industry, clothing industry, building materials and engineering industry.

Chieti is home to companies operating in various sectors, including:

- Walter Tosto Spa: multinational corporation, with products targeted to the following sectors: chemical industry, oil industry, energy industry (including nuclear and renewable energy), physical science research (e.g. International Thermonuclear Experimental Reactor, JT-60SA satellite project, DarkSide dark matter experiment), food industry, pharmaceutical industry, biotechnology, hydrogen production;
- Riveco Generalsider: siderurgy company;
- Toto Holding Spa: a company specialized in road and rail transport infrastructure, and renewable energy, with its subsidiary US Wind operating off the East Coast of the United States (it also founded an airline named Air One);
- Caffè Mokambo: coffee company;
- SIAC Fashion srl (also called Rodrigo): clothing industry business with worldwide sales.

In addition to these Chieti-based companies, there are other establishments of the following companies:

- Leonardo: Italian multinational company specializing in aerospace, defense and information security, with a "Global Security Operation Center" located at Chieti and high-performance computing capabilities;
- Dayco: American multinational corporation.

== Landmarks and culture ==
=== Historical streets and squares ===
==== Corso Marrucino ====
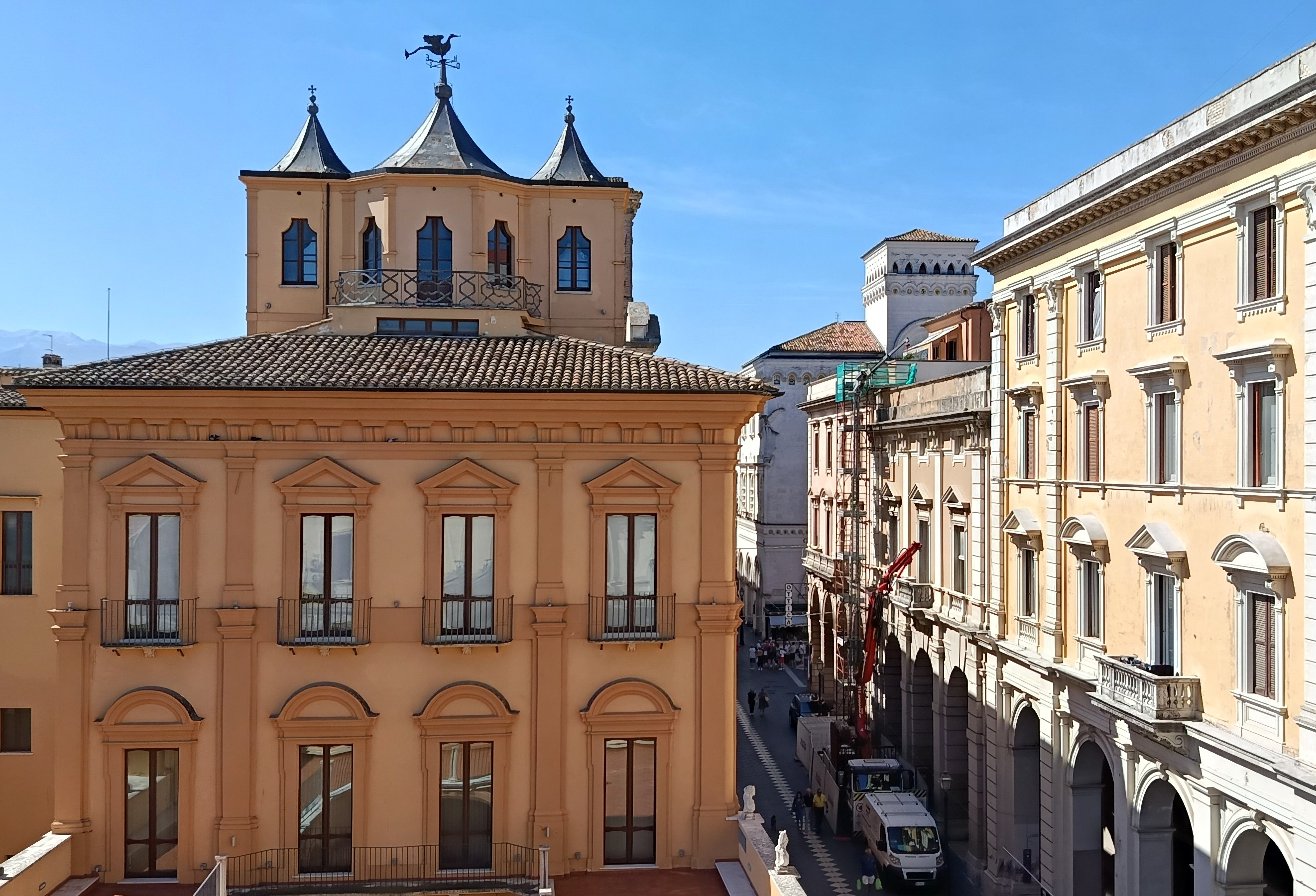
Palazzo De' Mayo

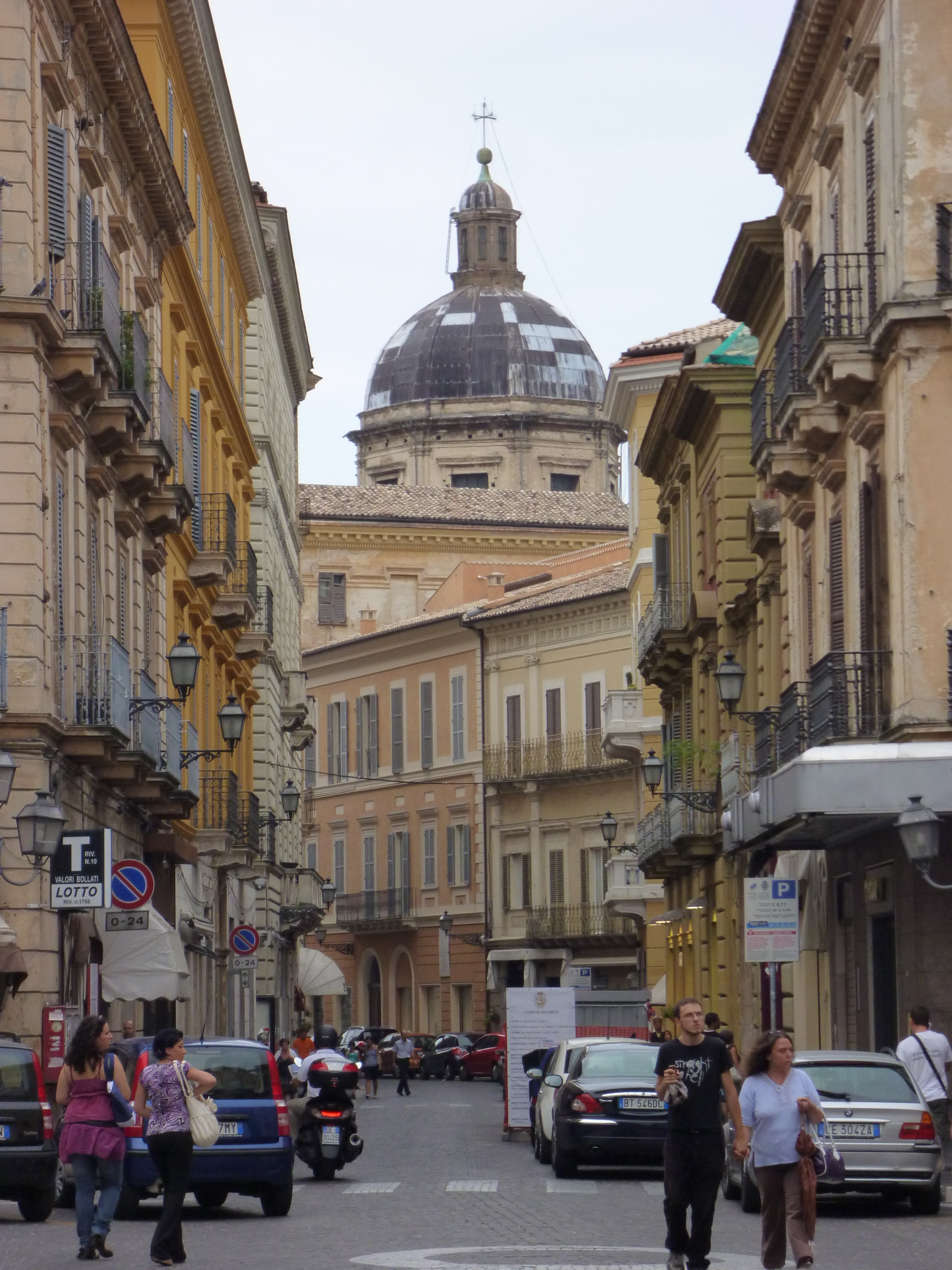
Corso Marrucino with the dome of San Francesco al Corso Church

Corso Marrucino (Italian for "Marrucinian Street"), the main street of Chieti's center, follows in its path part of the shape of Chieti's hill and is characterized by many buildings of different periods, which sometimes also present porches for pedestrians. Formerly known as "Corso Galiani", it was modified according to a project approved in 1890, which also enlarged the street through different demolitions.

Among the most representative architectures, there are the former local seat of the Bank of Italy (built at the beginning of the 20th century with neoclassical taste), the former seat of the local Chamber of Commerce, Industry, Agriculture and Artisanship (completed in 1930 in Neo-Gothic style), and the seat of the Province of Chieti (built between 1914 and 1928).

Older buildings are represented by the former Piarists' boarding school, the adjacent San Domenico church and De' Mayo palace. The former Piarists' boarding school, which now hosts the school named Convitto Nazionale Giambattista Vico with its homonymous liceo classico, was founded thanks to a will of 1636. The 16th-century De' Mayo palace, a former seat of the viceroy of Abruzzo, is built in Neapolitan style on Ancient Roman underground galleries, featuring a patio, a big stone portal, and an original Orientalizing turret.

==== Vittorio Emanuele II Square ====
As the main square of the old town, it has an elevation of 330 meters, and is located on a part of Chieti's hill called Colle Gallo. Even if it also commonly referred to as Saint Justin Square or "Piazza Grande" (i.e. "Big Square"), its official name is Vittorio Emanuele II Square. This name was given to the square in order to remember Victor Emmanuel II of Italy, who triumphally visited Chieti during the Italian unification, on October 18, 1860.

The square shows the Cathedral, but also other important buildings for Chieti, such as the seat of the comune (the town hall), the neo-Gothic tribunal, and Mezzanotte palace. A nobles' palace erected in 1517 has been the official town hall since 1870, even if that building was intensely modified and now only small elements of the old palace remain, including a loggia and some niches.

=== Churches ===
Chieti Cathedral
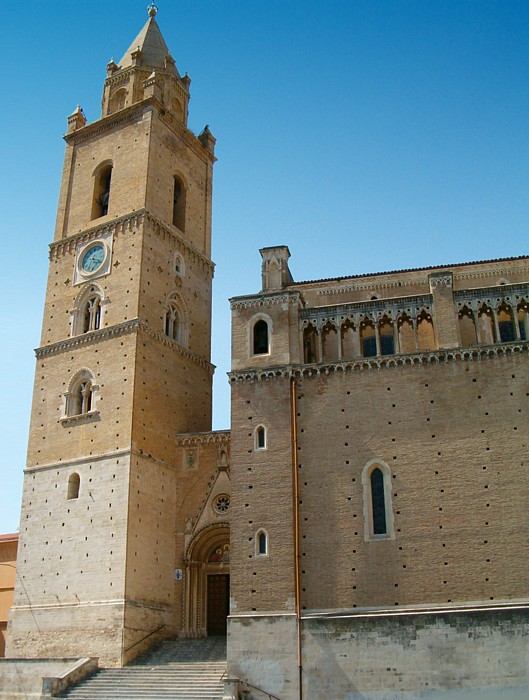
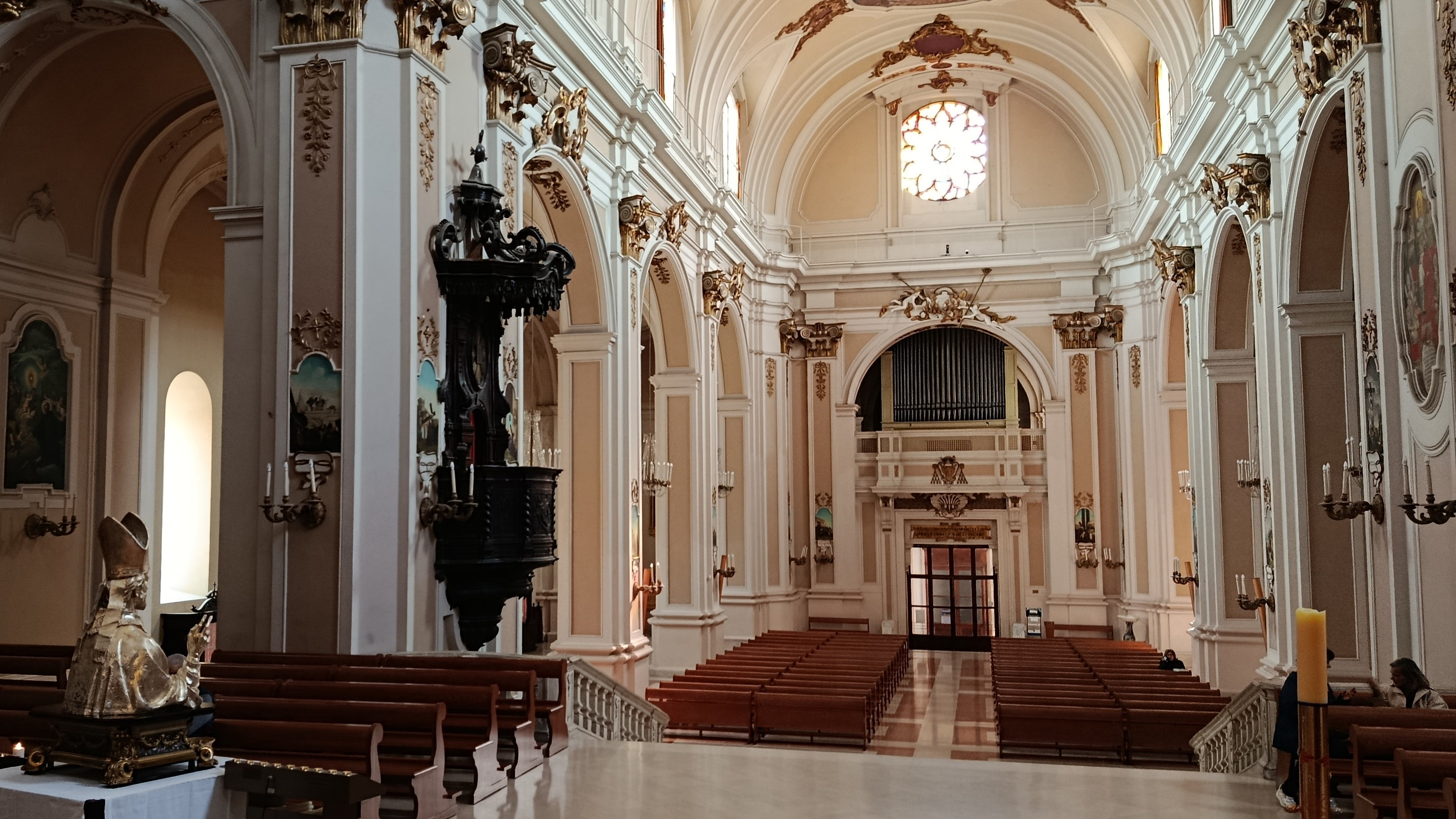

==== Chieti Cathedral ====
The cathedral is dedicated to Saint Justin of Chieti, but it was dedicated to Saint Thomas the Apostle in the past. The church was probably founded in the 8th century. According to the local tradition, it was rebuilt by Bishop Theodoric I in 840, after the sack by Pepin of Italy. Of that building only parts of the Romanesque crypt remain.

The church has been profoundly renovated several times over the centuries. The first three floors of the bell tower were erected by architect Bartolomeo di Giacomo in 1335, and the bell tower was completed with a bellcote and tented roof by Antonio da Lodi in 1498. The church was decorated again in the 17th century in the Baroque style. The 1703 Apennine earthquakes destroyed the tented roof of the bell tower and damaged the church, whose aspect was changed by the archbishop Francesco Brancia between 1764 and 1770. In the early 20th century the architect Antonio Cirilli consolidated the bell tower and extensively modified the exterior. The crypt hosts the relics of Saint Justin of Chieti.

Close to the cathedral there is the Baroque oratory of the Mount of the Dead Brotherhood, the oldest catholic fraternity of Chieti that was officially acknowledged by Pope Innocent X in 1648.

==== San Francesco al Corso ====
A church dedicated to Saint Francis, which has the traditional Latin cross plan, was probably founded in 1239 thanks to the nobleman Antonio Gizio, who donated his estate to the project. In the second half of the 14th century, a new façade was constructed, but it was rebuilt in the 17th century except at the top with a rose window. After years of decay, in 1689 they started an extensive restoration which changed the appearance of this church. At the end of the 19th century, the architect Torquato Scaraviglia added an external stairway and another intervention was commissioned by the noblewoman Theresa de Hortalis. The church has a hemispherical dome with trompe-l'œil paintings and ten chapels, whose improvements were financed by some of the most important families of Chieti of the time.

==== Santa Chiara ====
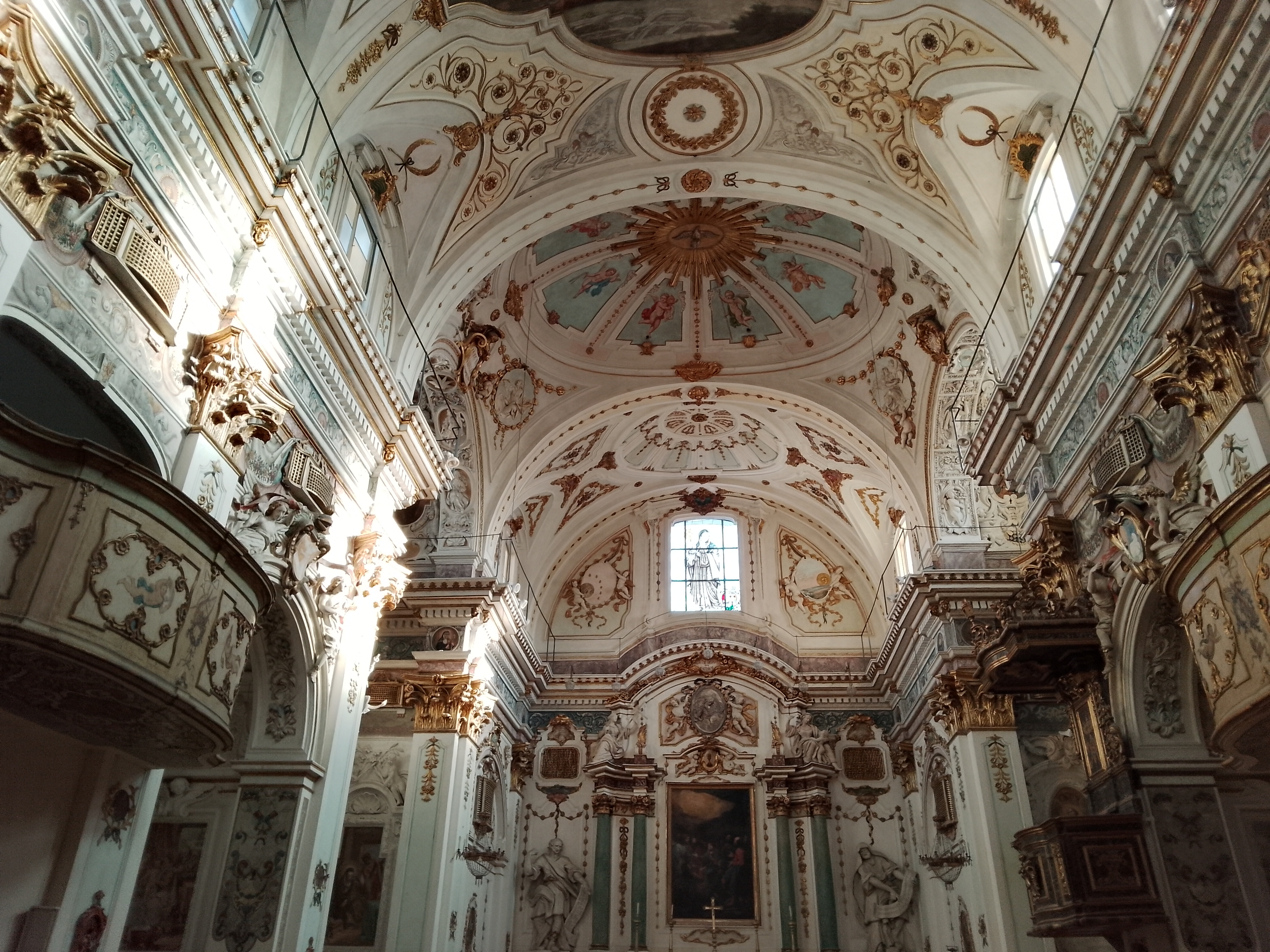
The interiors of the church

The Baroque church named Santa Chiara was built for the nuns of the Order of Saint Clare between 1644 and 1720 and presents a Latin cross floor plan with a single nave. The adjacent building, in the past convent with the name of Santo Spirito and now a Carabinieri center, was inhabited by the nuns from 1558 to the Italian Unification, who were for sure present in Chieti since the 14th century. Artworks of great importance preserved in this church are the wooden pulpit with gold and marble decorations, the 18th century organ, the vault painted with a representation of the Assumption of Mary, and the major altarpiece representing the Pentecost.

==== Santissima Trinità ====
Founded and built by a confraternity using local donations between 1586 and 1588, the church is named after the Holy Trinity. Adjacent to the church there was one of Chieti's town gates, which was partly included in the church and transformed into a chapel. The confraternity's hospital, which was later demolished, used to stand close to the church.

Today, the church features a single nave and a brick façade.

==== San Domenico ====
Along Corso Marrucino street there is San Domenico church, which was formerly dedicated to Saint Anne and built between 1642 and 1672 by the Piarists. The façade is in a Roman Baroque style with a brick Baroque bell tower, and the interiors are rich of decorations and preserve also artworks of another church demolished in 1913, whose name was reused for this church.

=== Public buildings ===
==== Teatro Marrucino ====
Teatro Marrucino
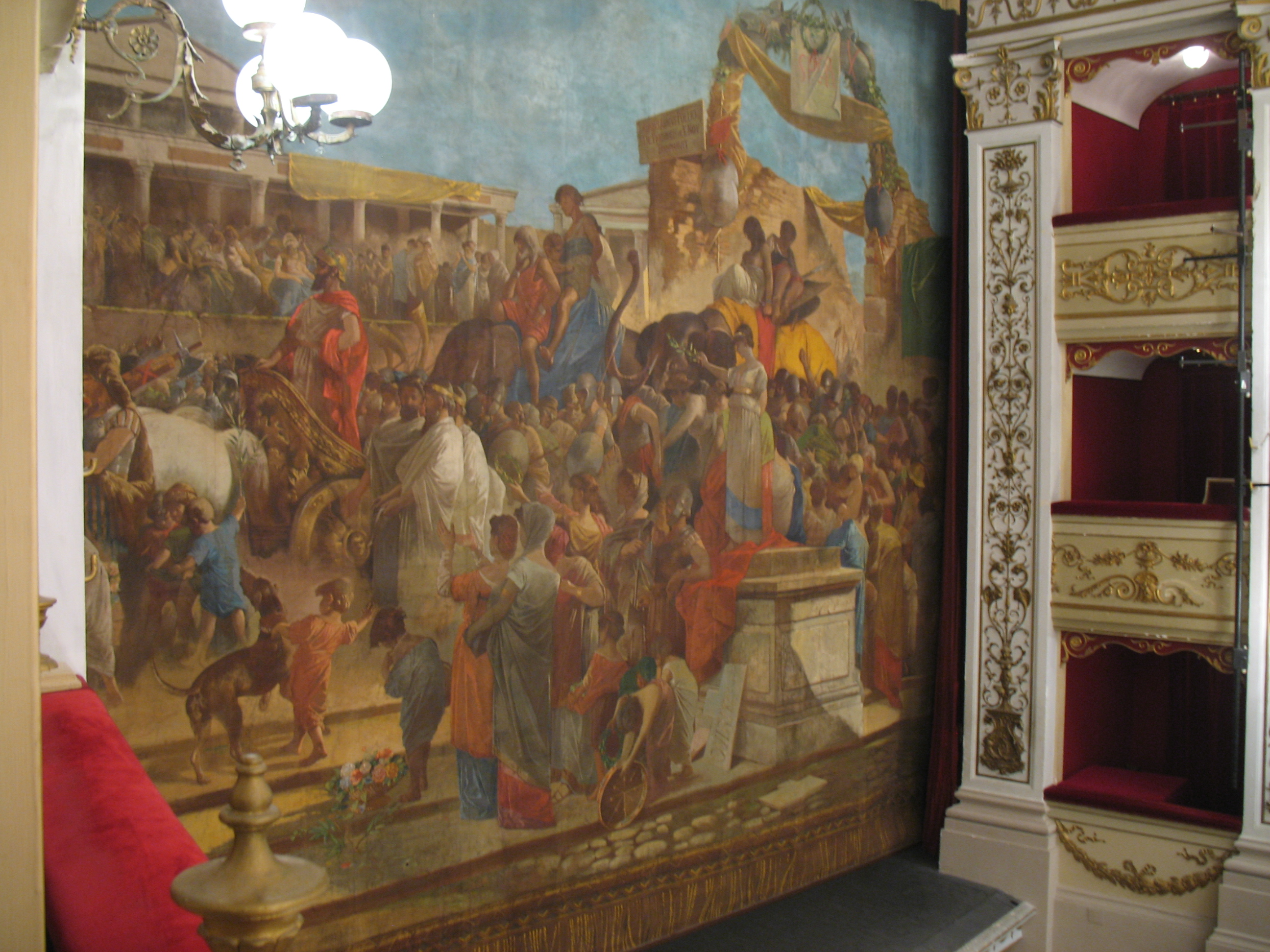

At the beginning of the 19th century, Chieti needed to have a larger and more modern theater to host the increased number of spectators, and the intense drama and opera production of that period. So, because of the inadequacy of the former theater (now named Venetians' Palace), Chieti's administration decided to demolish the Sant'Ignazio Church and build a new theater, which was named "Saint Ferdinand" as an homage to Ferdinand I of the Two Sicilies. It was built from 1813 to 1817, and inaugurated in 1818, with the first opera performed being La Cenerentola. After the Italian unification, the theater was renamed "Teatro Marrucino" (Italian for "Marrucinian Theater") after the pre-Roman Marrucini population, which inhabited the area. In 1872, thanks to the prestige of the institution, some interventions were commissioned, also to add an upper balcony (fifth level). In 1874, a new intervention was financed to improve the interiors, including the ceiling. This was decorated with a wooden rose window, surrounded by flower decorations, allegories of theatrical arts and music, and the portraits of great music or theater geniuses (Goldoni, Pergolesi, Shakespeare, Goethe, Paisiello, Alfieri, Rossini, Verdi). In 1875 the Neapolitan artist Giovanni Ponticelli painted the front curtain, representing the triumph over Dalmatae of Gaius Asinius Pollio.

=== Military architecture ===
==== Porta Pescara ====
Porta Pescara is the name of the only city gates existing today of the town walls that defended Chieti, with one dating back to the 13th century and the other built in 1797 on the orders of Baron Francesco Farina, an important administrator. The older one, which shows an elegant pointed arch, was realized in stone thanks to the donations collected by the bishop of Chieti. Their name derives from the fact that they gave access to the old road to today's Pescara.

=== Urban parks ===
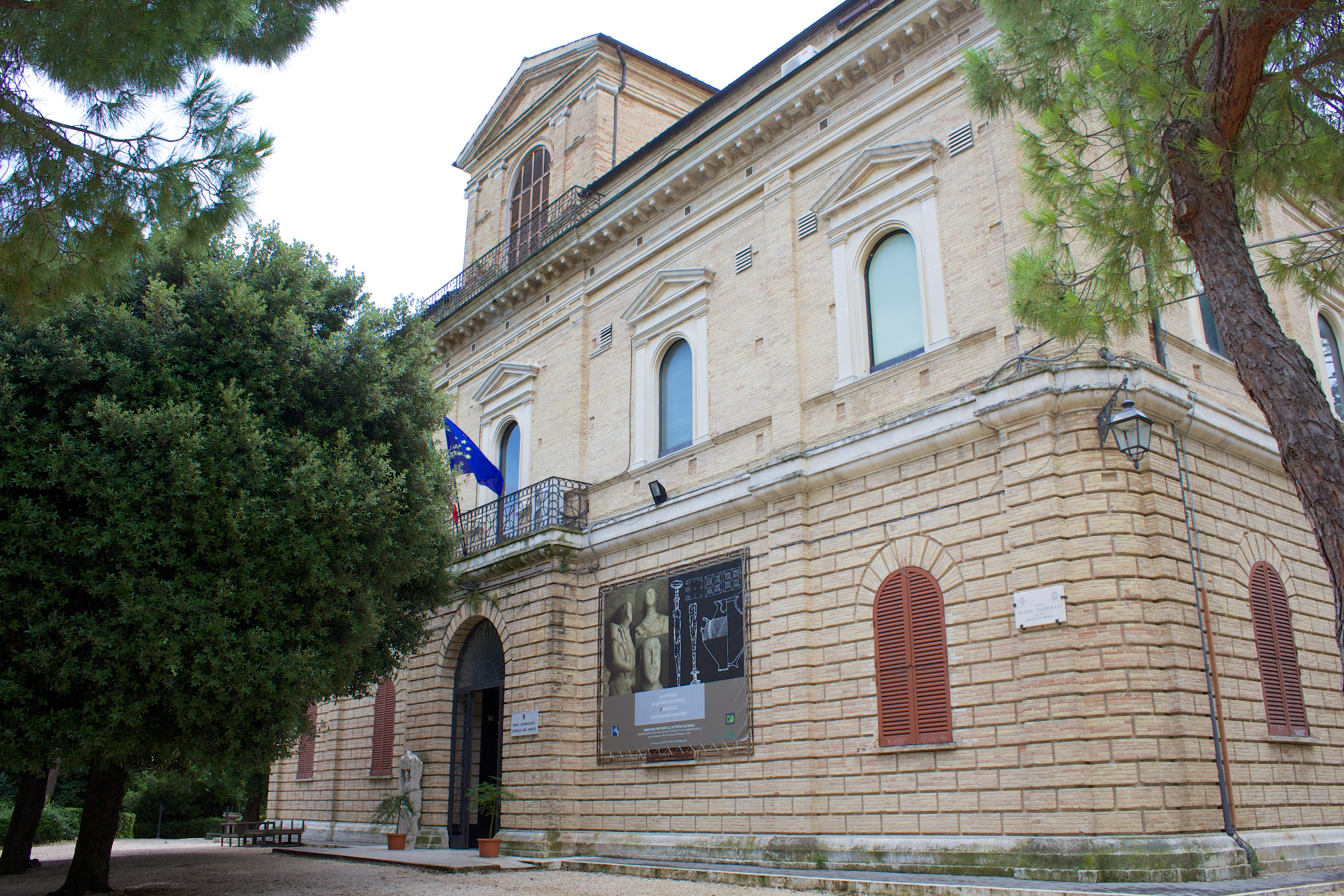
The National Archaeological Museum of Abruzzo surrounded by the urban park in Chieti.

==== Villa Comunale ====
Located at the Southern part of Chieti's hill, Villa Comunale is the major park in Chieti. It was created by merging the gardens of two nobles' villas (Frigerj Villa and Nolli Villa), gardens that started to be created in the first decades of the 19th century. After being bought by the comune, they were opened to the public for the first time in 1868. In the following years also other surrounding properties were bought and all were used to create a big urban park, with plants such as lindens, poplars, and cedars from Florence, which can be seen also today.

In the urban park, there are also a fountain bought in a French exposition of 1890, two artificial ponds, and a large bronze First World War memorial realized in 1924. Adjacent to the park, there is the former military hospital, which was located in an Order of Friars Minor's convent founded in 1420.

=== Archaeological sites ===
Some archaeological sites in Chieti

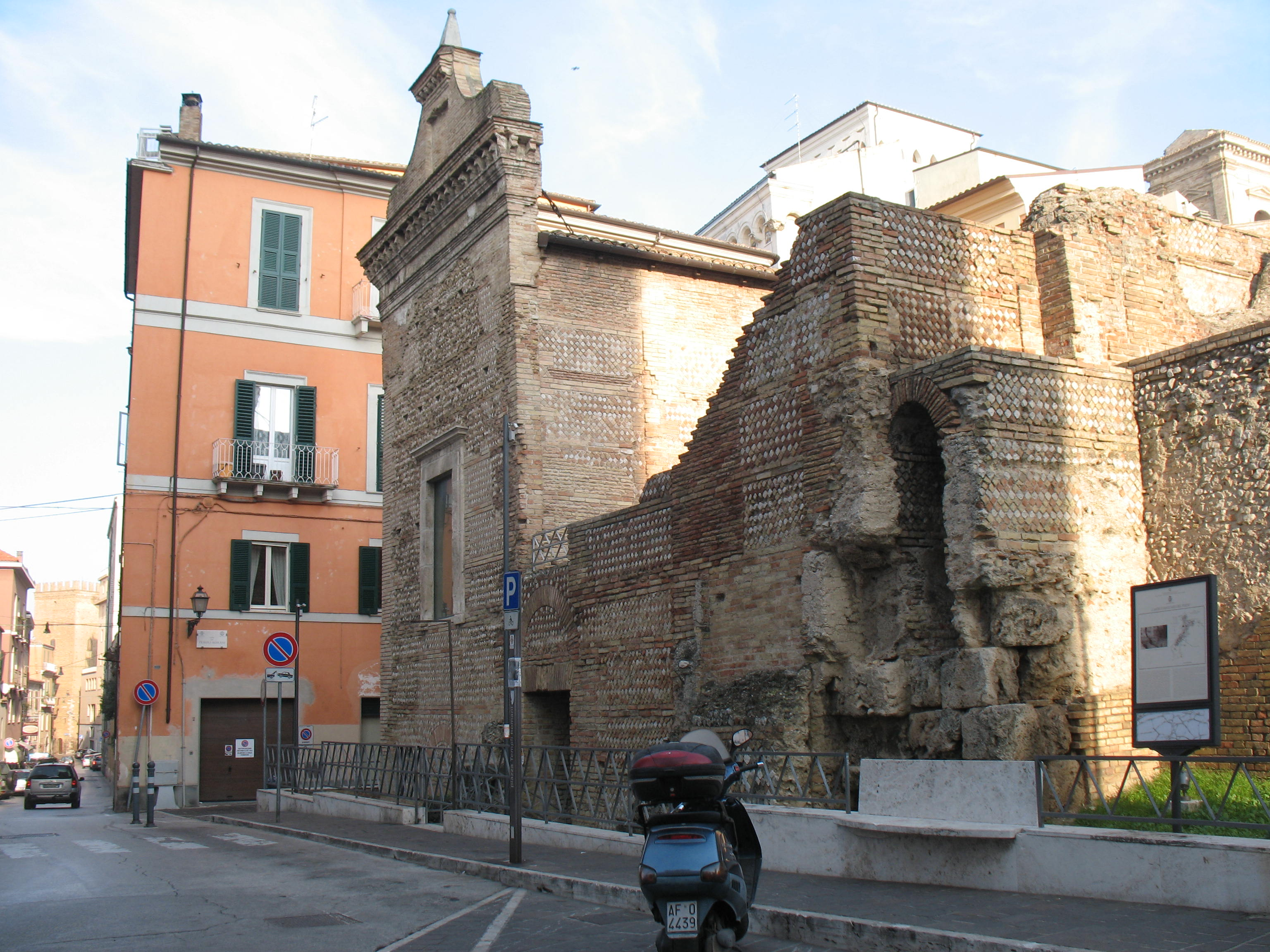
Roman temples of Chieti

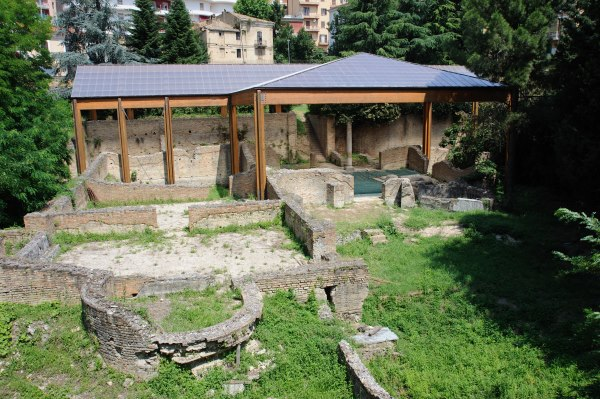
Roman thermae

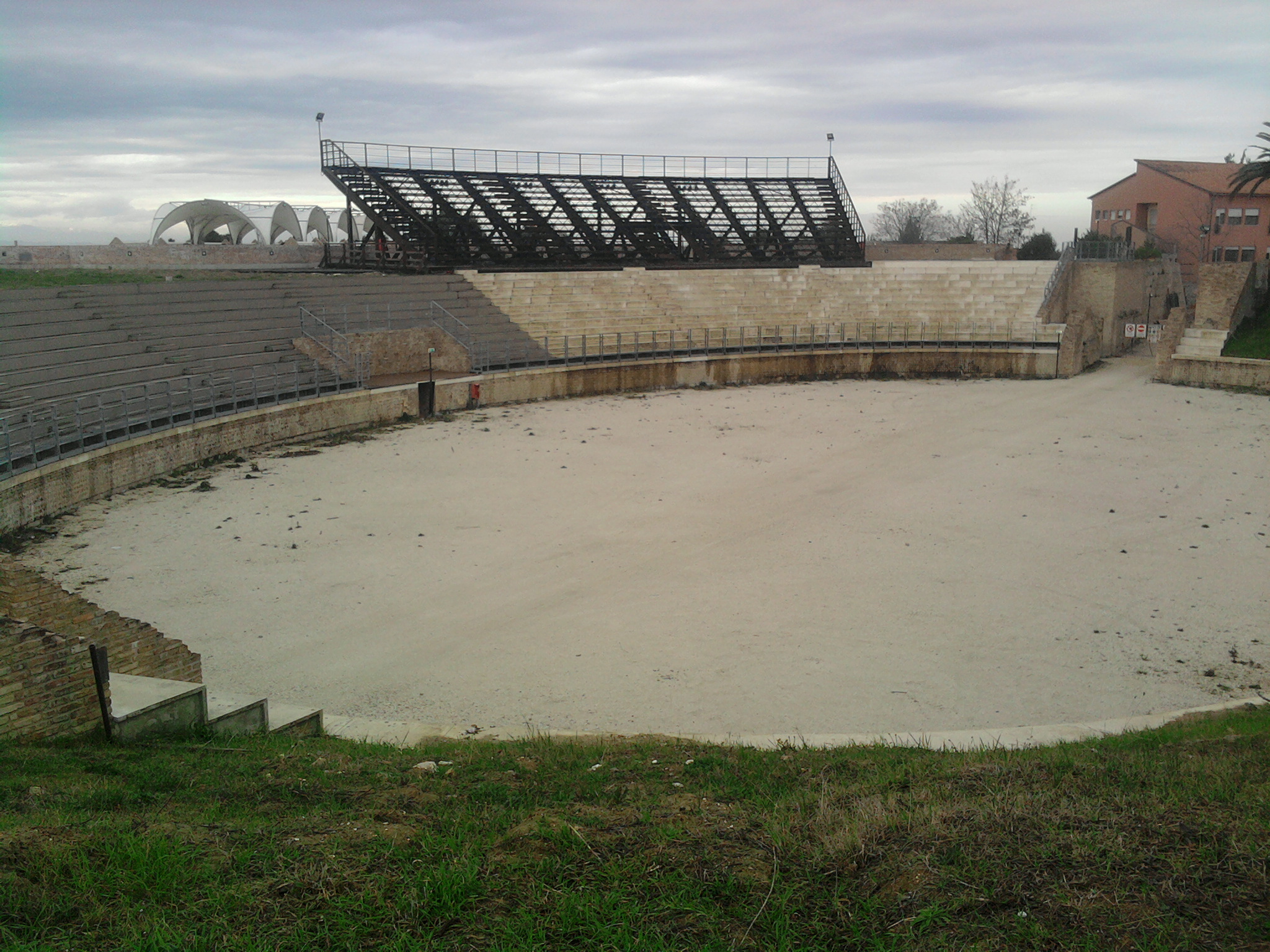
Remains of a Roman amphitheater

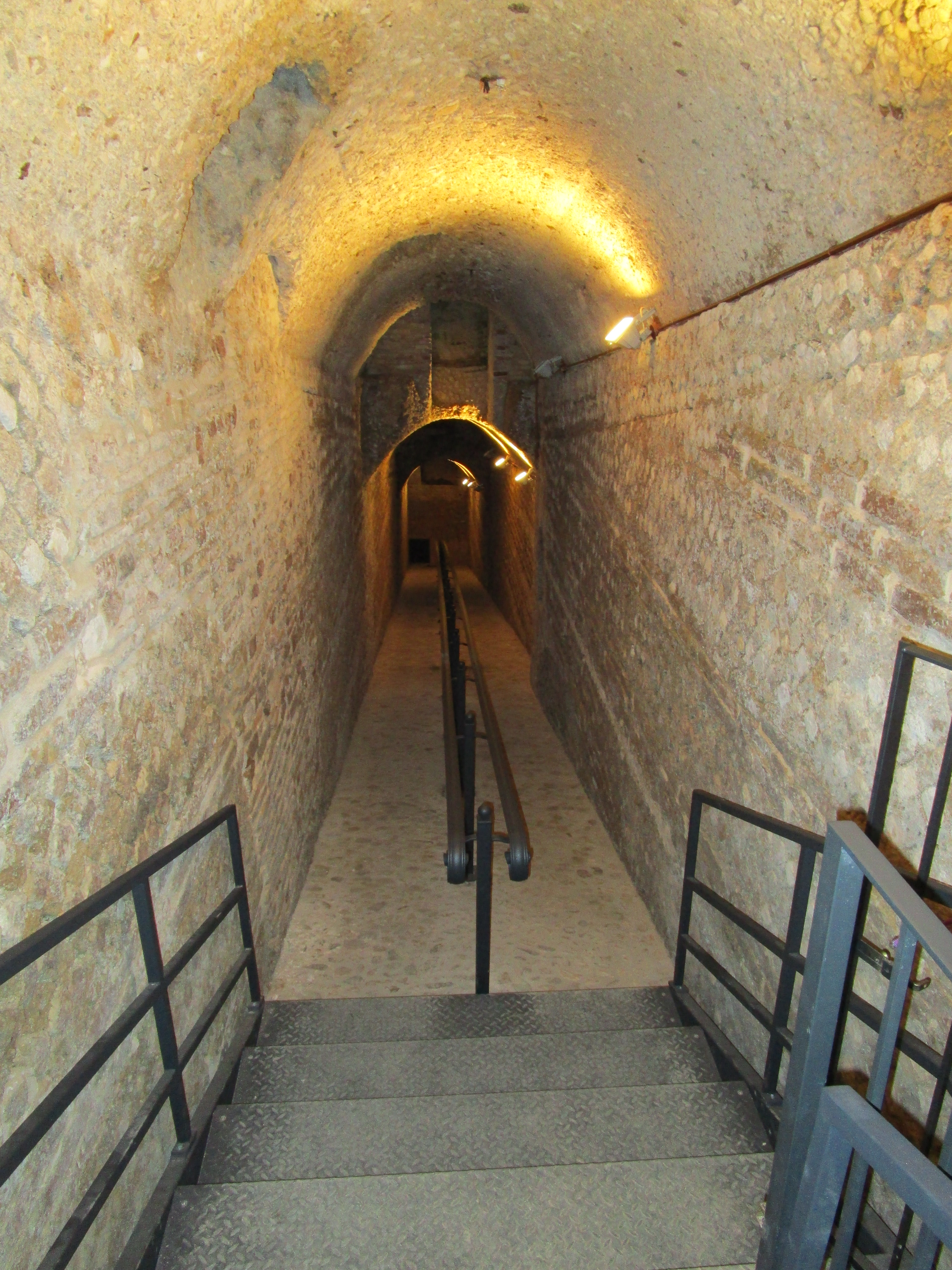
Via Tecta, an ancient Roman underground street

The territory of Chieti was the seat of Teate, a Roman town which was founded in an area inhabited since Prehistory and flourished in the first century BC, becoming a municipium. There are different Roman sites today in Chieti, including three temples, a theatre, a citadel with an amphitheatre, thermae and underground cisterns. In the citadel earthenware, statues and temple decoration dating back to the Republican Age were discovered, but also an amphitheater of the first century AD. The baths were divided in different rooms, decorated with mosaics that can be partially seen today, and fueled by a close cistern.

==== Roman theater ====
In the area of La Civitella there are the remains of a Roman theatre, which was probably built in the 1st century CE, a period of prosperity. The building had a diameter of about 80 meters and could host about 5,000 spectators, but today they can see little more than the left wing of its cavea with some corridors.

==== Roman temples ====
In 1935 Desiderato Scenna discovered the remains of four ancient Roman temples, the best-preserved one of which was used as a church since the 8th century and renamed after Saint Peter and Saint Paul, whereas another one has been removed to build a post office. The construction of the two twin temples and the smaller one was commissioned by Marcus Vetius Marcellus and his wife Helvidia Priscilla, who were favored by Nero. They do not know what divinities they were dedicated to, even if some scholars proposed that they were consecrated to the Capitoline Triad (Jupiter, Juno and Minerva). The walls are made of bricks, marble slabs, stone slabs and stone tiles, and the plan of the twin temples included a portico and underground spaces.

==== Subterranean structures ====
The thermae are connected to an underground cistern, which is a part of a complex Roman water supply system.

In addition, underneath the 18th-century Palazzo de' Mayo there is the so-called via tecta, an over 4 meters tall ancient Roman underground street, whose function is still debated.

=== Museums ===
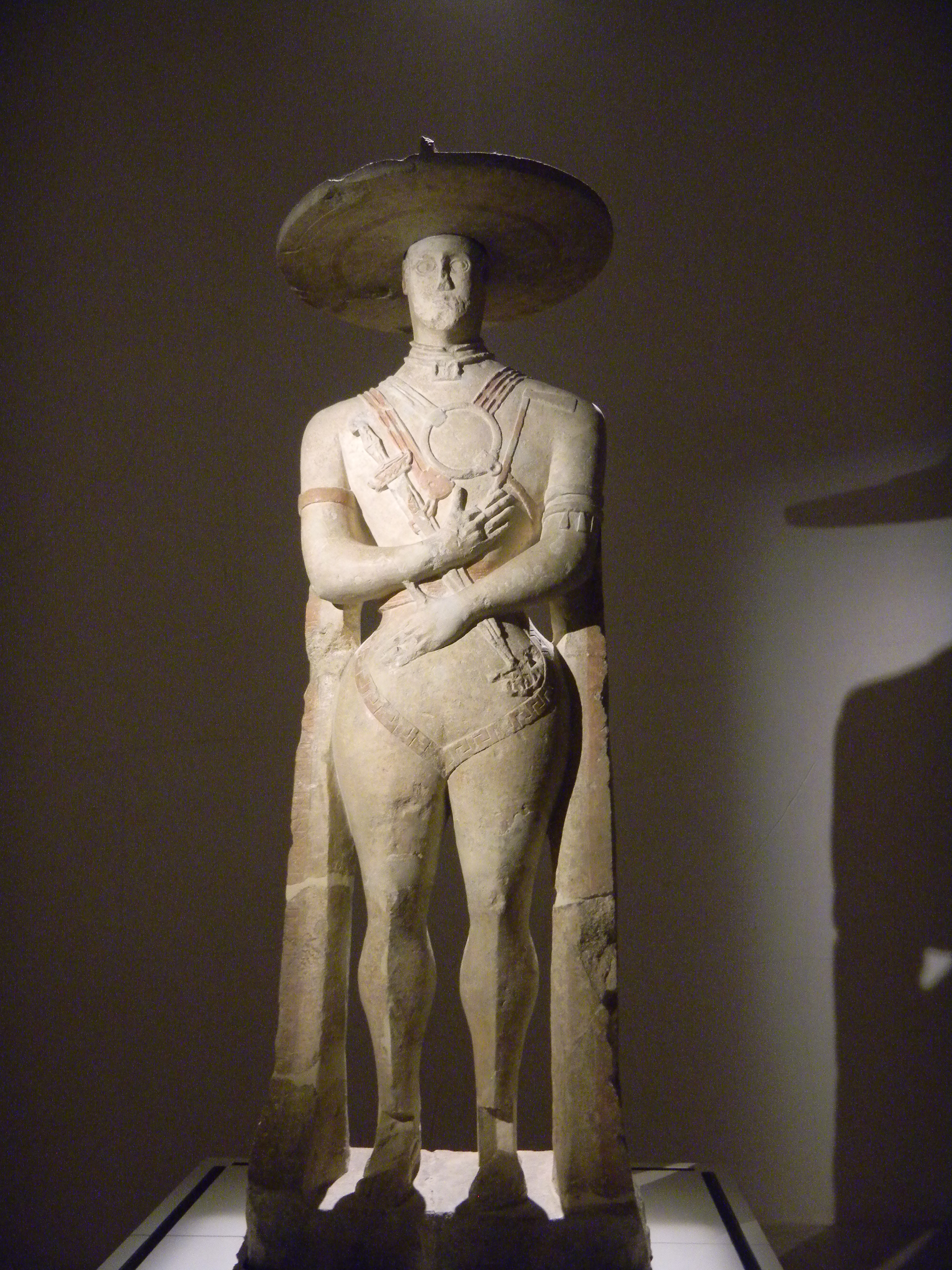
Warrior of Capestrano in the Museo Archeologico Nazionale d'Abruzzo

==== National Archaeology Museum of Abruzzo ====
The National Archaeology Museum of Abruzzo is surrounded by an urban park and is located in the former 19th-century Neoclassical residence of the Frigerj family. The rooms of the museum, which hosts the ancient Warrior of Capestrano, are dedicated to: Italic sculpture, Roman sculpture, a numismatic collection, a collection of antiquities created by Giovanni Pansa, the Vestini, the Peligni, the Marrucini and the Carricini.

==== La Civitella Archaeology Museum ====
The Archaeology Museum La Civitella lies at the archaeological site of the Roman amphitheatre and is focused on the Marrucini and the ancient history of Chieti. It also preserves the Funerary Monument of Lusius Storax.

==== Chieti Museum of Biomedical Sciences ====
The University Museum of History of Biomedical Sciences is managed by the University of Chieti-Pescara and exposes prehistoric finds, rocks, minerals, a malacological collection, medical devices of the early 20th century and a collection of contemporary art. The museum is located in the former local house of the Opera Nazionale Dopolavoro, an example of fascist architecture.

==== Costantino Barbella Art Museum ====
The art museum dedicated to Costantino Barbella is located in an 18th-century palace and houses frescoes, sculptures, paintings, and pottery from the 15th to the 20th centuries, including a collection of Maiolica from Castelli.

==== Diocesan Museum of Chieti ====
The Museo Diocesano Teatino (Italian for "Diocesan Museum of Chieti") is located in the 17th-century Church of Saint Dominic and hosts frescoes from the 14th to the 16th century, wooden statues and paintings.

=== Events ===
==== Good Friday procession ====
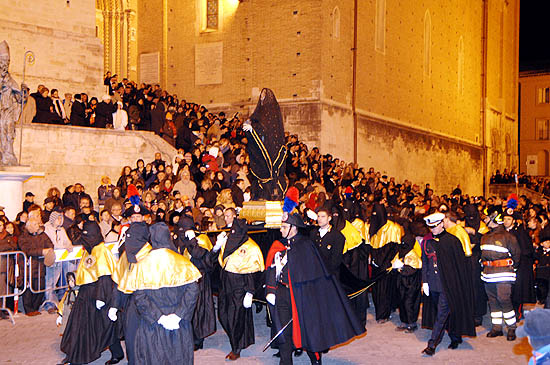
Hooded men joining Good Friday procession

According to some historians, Good Friday procession, which is considered Italy's oldest religious procession, has taken place in Chieti since 842. From historical documented sources, the origins of its current form date back to the 16th century. It is organized by the Mount of the Dead Brotherhood, an old local fraternity, with different sacred symbols, including an 18th-century wooden Christ sculpture, an Our Lady of Sorrows statue (which is dressed every time for the event by a selected group of women), seven symbols of Passion. The procession starts at the Cathedral at sunset and goes through the principal streets of the old town, where torches on wrought iron tripods are placed. Different people take part, adults and children: the hooded members of the Mount of the Dead Brotherhood and other brotherhoods of the town, clergymen, members of the Order of the Holy Sepulcher, and a choir and an orchestra performing Miserere by Saverio Selecchy (a local composer of the 18th century).

== Education ==
=== Schools ===
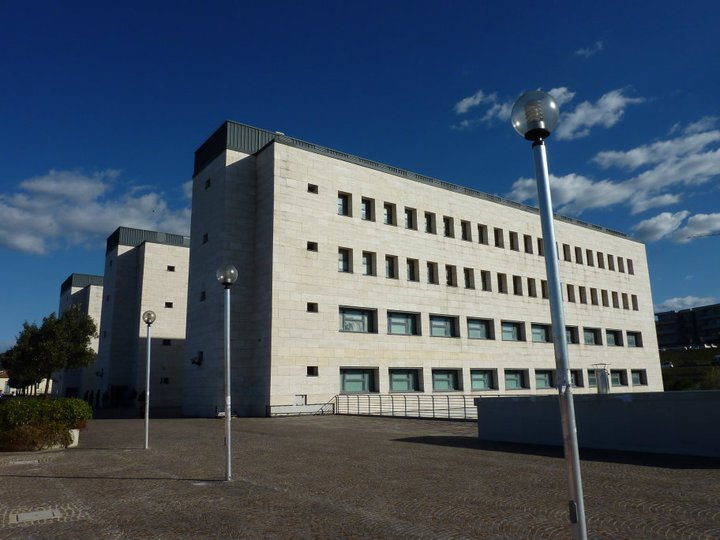
University in Chieti Scalo

Chieti has different state and private kindergartens, different state primary and middle schools, a private secondary school (the D.O.G.E. School College) and 7 state secondary schools: Istituto "Luigi di Savoia" (1529 students), Istituto tecnico "Galiani-De Sterlich", Liceo "Isabella Gonzaga", Liceo scientifico "Filippo Masci", Istituto "Umberto Pomilio", Liceo classico "G.B. Vico" and Liceo artistico statale.

=== University ===
Chieti Scalo is home of the governing bodies of D'Annunzio University of Chieti–Pescara, offering a variety of 1st and 2nd cycle courses, and postgraduate education. Chieti and Pescara therefore host more than 20,000 students. In particular, different university departments are located in Chieti, covering academic disciplines such as medicine, health sciences, building engineering, geology, pharmacy, neuroscience, psychology, humanities, art, social science, philosophy and pedagogy.

The Institute for Advanced Biomedical Technologies (or ITAB) of the University of Chieti–Pescara is a biomedical research center focused on neuroimaging (e.g. functional magnetic resonance imaging or magnetoencephalography). ITAB became one of the first partners of the National Institutes of Health-funded Human Connectome Project, and continues to contribute to it.

== Infrastructure and public services ==
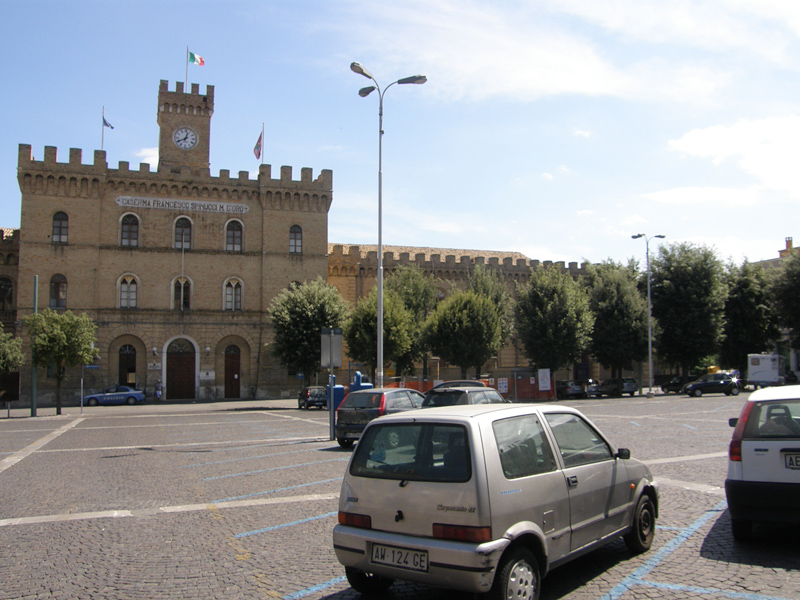
Police headquarters in Chieti

=== Healthcare ===
In Chieti the health service is under the administration of ASL Lanciano-Vasto-Chieti, which manages SS. Annunziata polyclinic, Chieti's main hospital, with its emergency department. Villa Pini and Spatocco private hospitals are located in Chieti.

=== Public safety ===
Chieti is home to police stations (including offices of Polizia Stradale and Polizia Postale e delle Comunicazioni), Carabinieri stations, a Guardia di Finanza headquarters, a prison, and a fire station with the local fire department headquarters. Furthermore, both the province of Chieti and the municipality have their local police agencies: provincial police and municipal police.

=== Transport ===
==== Public transport ====
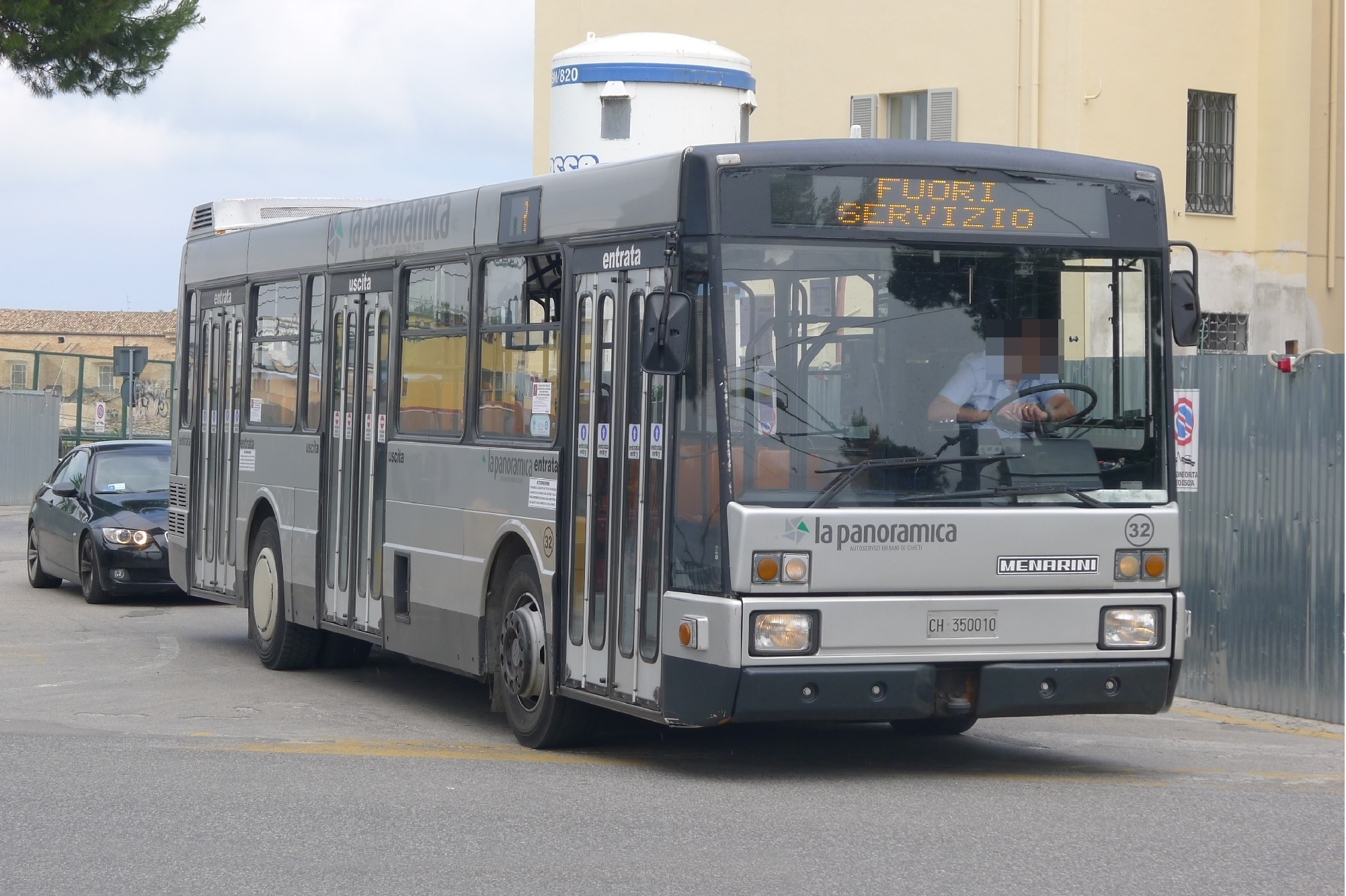
La Panoramica-managed bus in Chieti

The public transport bus service in Chieti is principally provided by companies Società Unica Abruzzese di Trasporto and La Panoramica.

As the municipal public transport company, La Panoramica operates different urban lines, including the Chieti trolleybus system.

Società Unica Abruzzese di Trasporto (or TUA) is a regional public transport company which operates bus and rail services.

==== Main roads ====
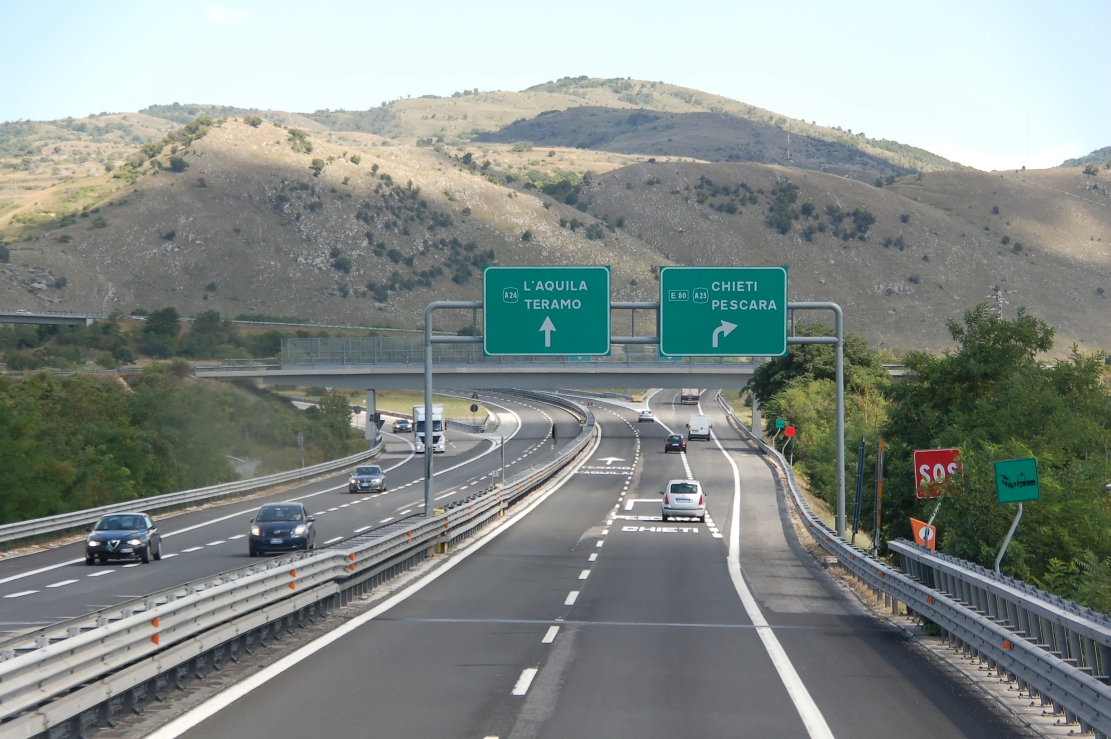
Road signs for Chieti on the Autostrada A24

Chieti is served by the following motorways.

Autostrada A14
"Adriatic Motorway" runs north-south, from Bologna to Taranto. It can be accessed through "Pescara ovest - Chieti" exit.
Autostrada A25
The A25 runs from the Adriatic coast to Torano (Borgorose) and provides an indirect connection from Chieti to Rome.
Raccordo autostradale RA12
It is associated to the European route E80.

In addition to these motorways, there are other important road connections that allow to reach Chieti from the surrounding territory.

Strada statale 5 Via Tiburtina Valeria
SS5, as a secondary connection to Rome, is also named after the Ancient Roman Via Tiburtina.
Strada statale 81 Piceno Aprutina
SS81 connects Chieti to Teramo.
Strada statale 656 Val Pescara-Chieti

==== Railways and train stations ====
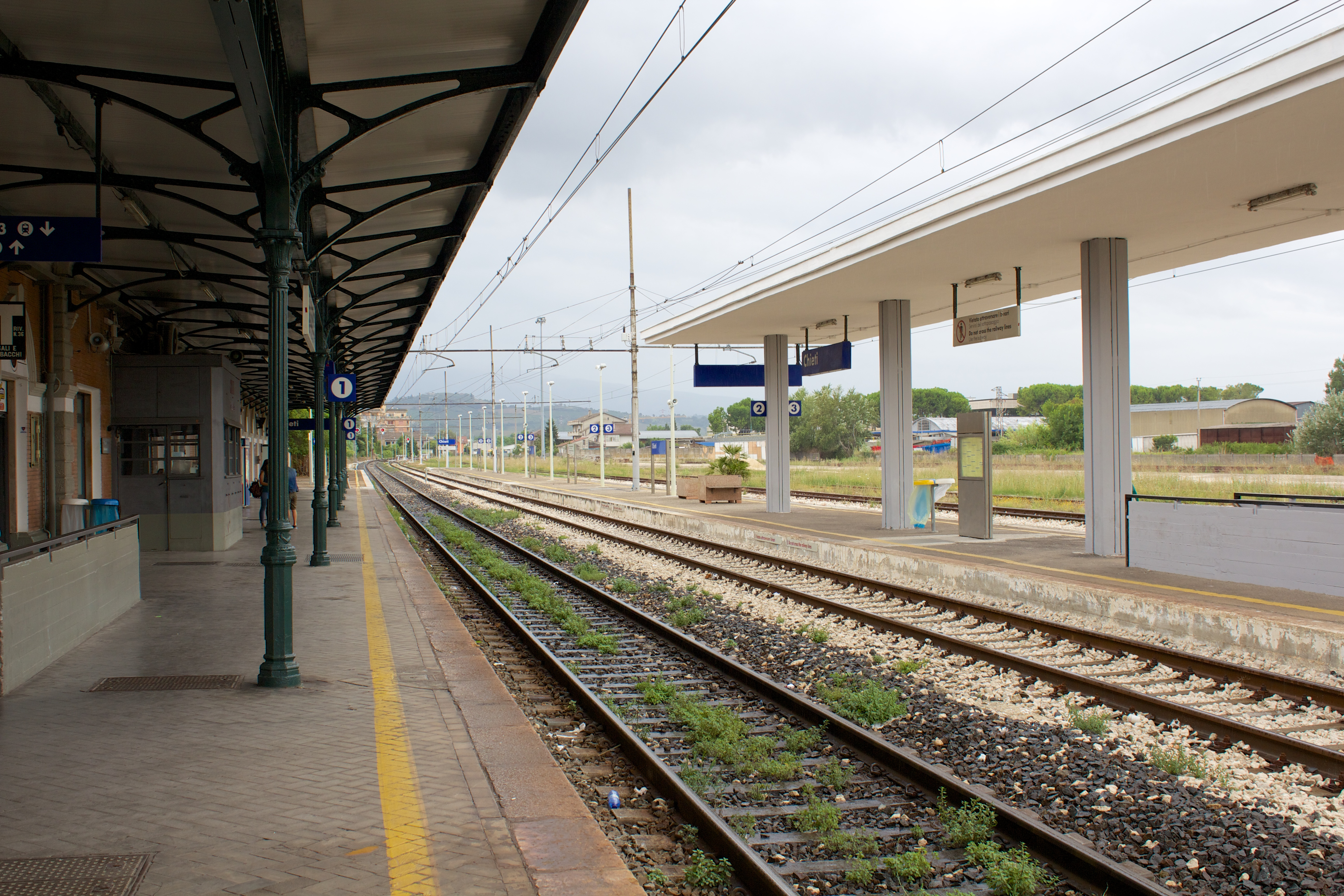
Chieti railway station

Chieti Scalo is crossed by the Rome–Sulmona–Pescara railway and is home to two passenger train stations: Chieti railway station and the smaller Chieti–Madonna delle Piane railway station. The Rome–Sulmona–Pescara railway is an important connection from Chieti to the Adriatic railway. On the border between Manoppello and Chieti (at Brecciarola), a freight station named Stazione di Interporto d'Abruzzo serves a logistics center.

A railway connecting the old town and Chieti Scalo was closed in 1943.

==== Nearby ports and airports ====
Chieti is about 12 kilometres (7.5 mi) from Abruzzo Airport, the only international airport in Abruzzo.

The main regional ports for merchant ships are those of Ortona (Port of Ortona), Pescara (Port of Pescara) and Vasto (Port of Vasto).

== Media ==
In Chieti there are the headquarters of Rete8, a local television station focused on self-produced television shows.

Chieti-born film director Luciano Odorisio chose his birthplace as the setting and filming location for Sciopèn (1982) and Via Paradiso (1988). In addition, Chieti was used as a partial filming location for Ambo (2014) and Omicidio all'italiana (2017).

== Sport ==
The 6th stage of 2024 Giro d'Italia Women finished at Chieti on 12th of July. Liane Lippert was the victor.

Football club SSD Chieti FC 1922 are situated in Chieti, playing their home games at the Stadio Guido Angelini. They have housed notable players such as Fabio Quagliarella, Fabio Grosso, and Enrico Chiesa.

== Notable people ==
=== Ancient Roman families and individuals from Teate (present-day Chieti) ===
- Asinia gens, a plebeian family of Marrucinian origin from Teate, with the following notable members born there:
  - Herius Asinius, military leader of the Marrucini killed in the Social War against the Roman Republic
  - Gaius Asinius Pollio, Ancient Roman military leader, politician (consul in 40 BC), orator, writer, historian and patron of Virgil
  - Gaius Asinius Gallus, politician and writer
- Marcus Vitorius Marcellus, politician
- Lusius Storax, wealthy freedman, politician and best known for his funerary monument preserved in Archaeological Museum La Civitella.

=== People born in Chieti ===
==== Actors ====
- Lidia Broccolino
- Alessia Barela
- Giulia Di Quilio
- Giacomo Ferrara

==== Athletes ====
- Lorenzo Parente, Italian American professional wrestler
- Vittorio Visini, race walker
- Filippo Antonelli, football player
- Gianluca Capitano, cyclist
- Stefano Mancinelli, basketball player
- Stefano Mammarella, futsal player
- Fabrizia D'Ottavio, rhythmic gymnast
- Giulio Ciccone, cyclist

==== Businesspeople ====
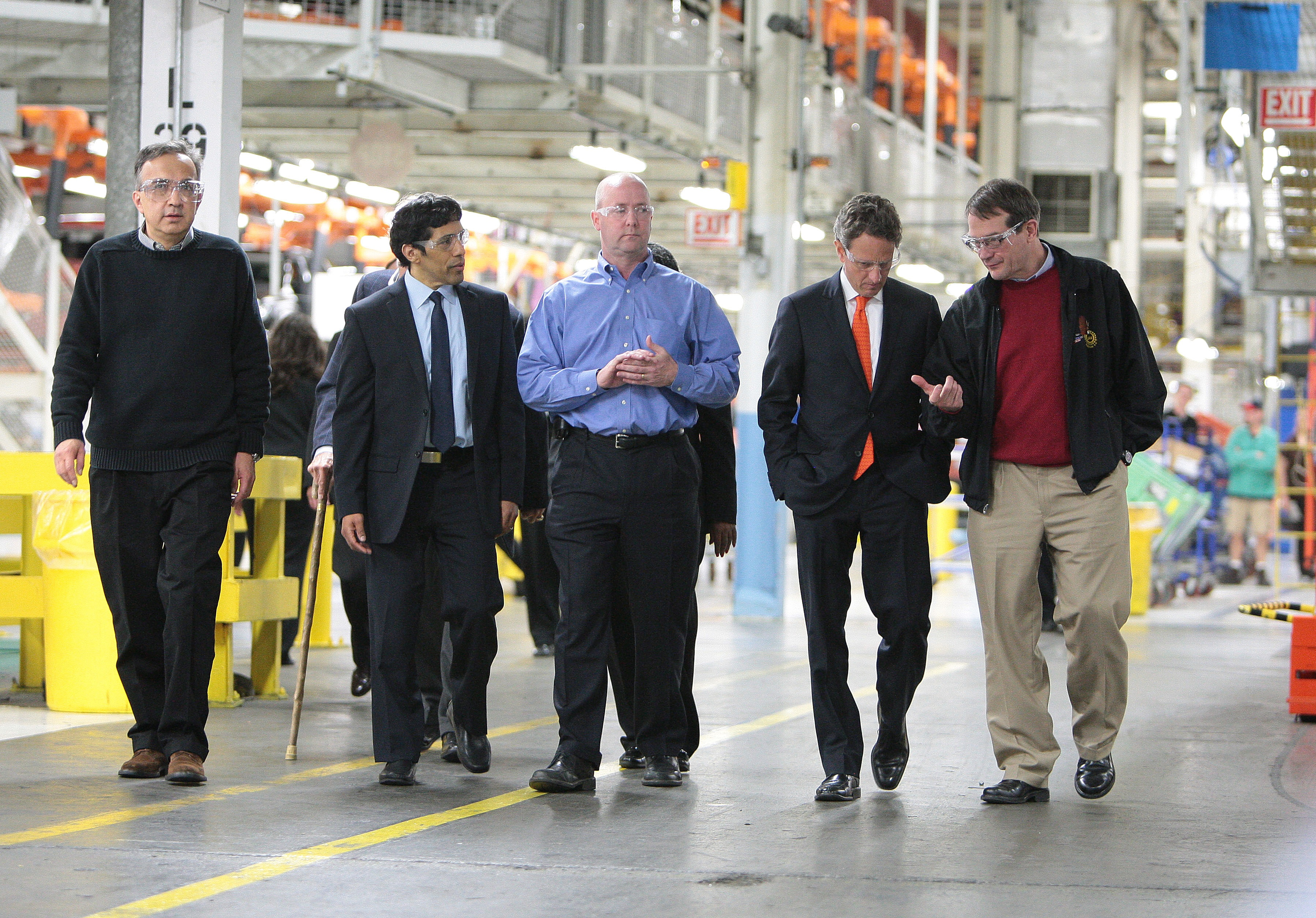
From left to right, Chrysler Group CEO Sergio Marchionne, Congressman Hansen Clarke (MI-13), Plant Manager Pat Walsh, US Treasury Secretary Tim Geithner, and United Auto Workers President Bob King on a tour of Jefferson North Assembly Plant (JNAP) in Detroit in April 2011

- Sergio Marchionne (1952 – 2018), Italian Canadian former CEO of Ferrari, Fiat S.p.A. and Fiat Chrysler Automobiles
- Pierluigi Zappacosta (born 1950), Italian American co-founder of Logitech, and former President and CEO of Sierra Sciences

==== Explorers ====
- Giovanni Chiarini (1849 – 1879), explorer of Africa

==== Film directors ====
- Anton Giulio Majano
- Luciano Odorisio
- Lars Kraume

==== Musicians ====
- Maurizio Colasanti, conductor

==== Politicians ====
- Antonio Nolli (1754 – 1830), Minister of Finance of the Napoleonic Kingdom of Naples
- Augusto Pierantoni (1840 – 1911), jurist and member of Senate of the Kingdom of Italy
- Giovanni Pace (1933 – 2018), president of Abruzzo and member of the Chamber of Deputies

==== Religious figures ====
- Illuminato da Chieti, Franciscan friar
- Alessandro Valignano (1539 – 1606), Jesuit priest and missionary

==== Scientists ====
- Giovanni Fortunato Bianchini (1719–1779), physician and physicist

==== Social sciences and humanities ====
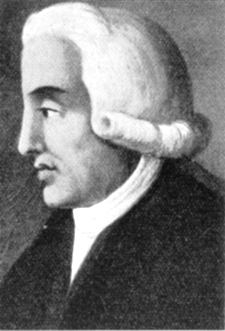
Mercantilist economist and abbot Ferdinando Galiani was a diplomat in France and an advisor to the Kingdom of Naples.

- Nicoletto Vernia (c. 1420 – 1499), philosopher
- Girolamo Nicolino (1604 – 1664), historian and jurist
- Niccolò Toppi (1607 – 1681), historian
- Ferdinando Galiani (1728 – 1787), economist and author of Della Moneta
- Umberto Ricci (1879 – 1946), economist and statistician
- Ettore Paratore (1907 – 2000), Latinist
- Brunilde Ridgway (born 1929), archaeologist

==== Visual arts ====
- Giovanni Battista Spinelli, painter
- Filippo Rega (1761 – 1833), engraver and medalist
- Nicola De Laurentiis (1783 – 1832), painter
- Costantino Barbella (1852 – 1925), sculptor
- Luciano de Liberato, abstract painter

==== Writers ====
- Federico Valignani (1700 – 1754)
- Pasquale de Virgiliis (1812 – 1876), writer and politician

==== Other individuals ====
- Severino Di Giovanni: anarchist who exiled himself to Argentina in 1922 and participated in an assassination plot against president of the United States Herbert Hoover
- Francesca Mambro, neo-fascist terrorist

=== People who lived in Chieti ===
==== Fine arts ====
- Francesco Paolo Michetti, painter
- Tommaso Cascella, painter and ceramic artist who worked as teacher and artist in Chieti

==== Humanities scholars ====
- Joseph Allegranza, Dominican historian, archaeologist and antiquarian

==== Notable bishops and archbishops of Chieti ====
- Saint Justin of Chieti
- Oliviero Carafa, cardinal and military leader
- Pope Paul IV, born Gian Pietro Carafa
- Bernardino Maffei, cardinal
- Loris Francesco Capovilla, personal secretary to Pope John XXIII and oldest living cardinal at the time of his death
- Vincenzo Fagiolo, cardinal
- Bruno Forte, theologian and current archbishop

== Relations ==
Chieti has "friendship pacts" with:

- Trento, Italy.

The agreement was signed in 2011 in remembrance of the precursor of the now defunct 123rd Infantry Regiment "Chieti", whose men were among the first militaries to enter Trento on November 3, 1918 (at the end of World War I).

- Minamishimabara, Nagasaki Prefecture, Japan.

On the basis of the cultural legacy of Chieti-born Jesuit missionary Alessandro Valignano, who disembarked at present-day Minamishimabara on July 25, 1579, the Japanese and Italian towns have started different kinds of cultural exchanges in 2011. They signed an offician "friendship pact" in 2016.

== See also ==
- Chieti railway station
- Trolleybuses in Chieti
- Asinia gens
