= Alento =

Alento is the name of two Italian rivers:

- Alento (Abruzzo), in the provinces of Chieti and Pescara
- Alento (Campania), in the province of Salerno
