= Liceo scientifico Filippo Masci =

Liceo Scientifico Statale "Filippo Masci"
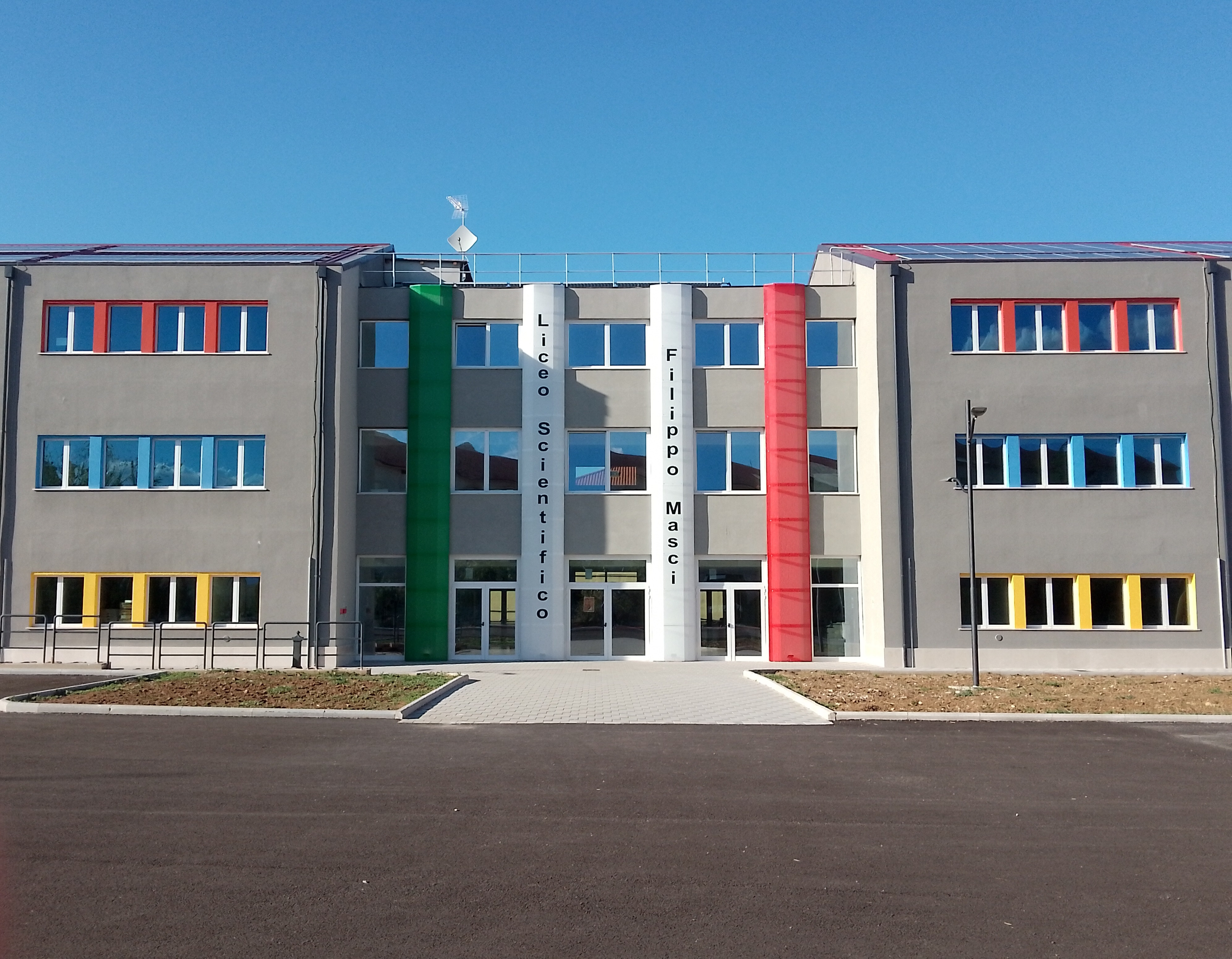
- Chieti; Italy

Information
- Type: State liceo scientifico
- Established: 1923
- Principal: Sara Solipaca
- Enrollment: 679
- Website: www.liceomasci.it

Liceo scientifico Filippo Masci is an Italian state secondary school in Chieti, Abruzzo, offering different liceo scientifico curricula to students typically aged from 14 to 19 years old.

In 2024, the old main building has been abandoned in favor of a newly built seat at former 123rd Infantry Regiment "Chieti" location, in Chieti.

The previous main seat of the school housed the local Chamber of Commerce, Industry, Agriculture and Artisanship from 1863 and afterwards another high school (Istituto Luigi di Savoia).

== Academics ==
The liceo offers nowadays traditional and applied sciences option curricula, but also a Cambridge International enhanced curriculum, more focused on English language and with a IGSCE examination, and a Biomedical enhancement established nationally by an agreement between the Italian Minister of Education and the Italian professional order of physicians.

== History ==
Liceo scientifico Filippo Masci was among the first licei scientifici to be opened in Italy due to 1923 Regio decreto n. 1054, part of Gentile reform, and was named in honor of Neo-Kantian philosopher and politician Filippo Masci, who had died in 1922. The aim of the creation of this kind of secondary schools was the education of future students of medicine or scientific disciplines, with a focus on scientific culture. At that time students were predominantly male and native of the province of Chieti, but some of them were born in other parts of Abruzzo, Molise, Marche, Argentine or United States.

From 1943 to 1944, during the World War II, the lessons were suspended and the school was opened to accommodate some displaced inhabitants of the province of Chieti.

In 1946, the name was changed from Regio Liceo Scientifico (Italian for "Royal Scientific Lyceum") to Liceo Scientifico Statale (Italian for "State Scientific Lyceum").

For many years there were only 5 classes, but from the 1970s the students started to increase in number, so, when the growth finished, there were about 35-40 classes.

In 2014 it was elected the "best secondary school in Abruzzo" by Eduscopio, a project of the Giovanni Agnelli Foundation.

== Notable alumni ==
- Concezio Bozzi, physicist
- Maccio Capatonda, actor, comedian and film director
- Angelo De Luca (Casalincontrada, 1904-1975), senator and minister of communications
- Umberto Di Primio, mayor of Chieti
- Daniela Torto, deputy for the Five Star Movement
