= Brecciarola =

Coordinates: 42°19′31″N 14°05′35″E

- Frazione
- Interactive map of Brecciarola
- Country: Italy
- Region: Abruzzo
- Province: Chieti
- Time zone: UTC+1 (CET)
  - Summer (DST): UTC+2 (CEST)

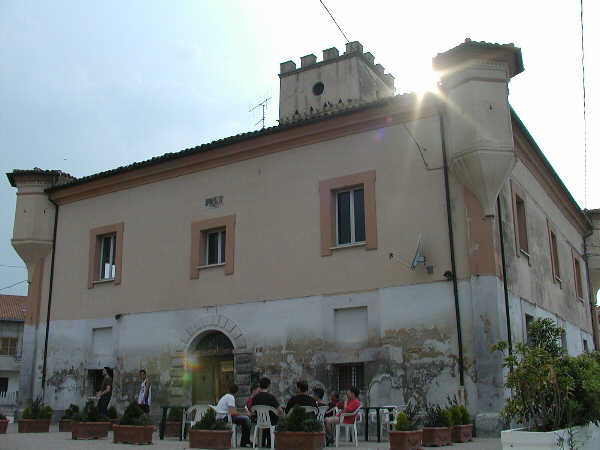
Brecciarola

Brecciarola (Abruzzese: La Vrèccë) is a frazione in Chieti, in the Abruzzo region of Italy.
