= Alento (Abruzzo) =

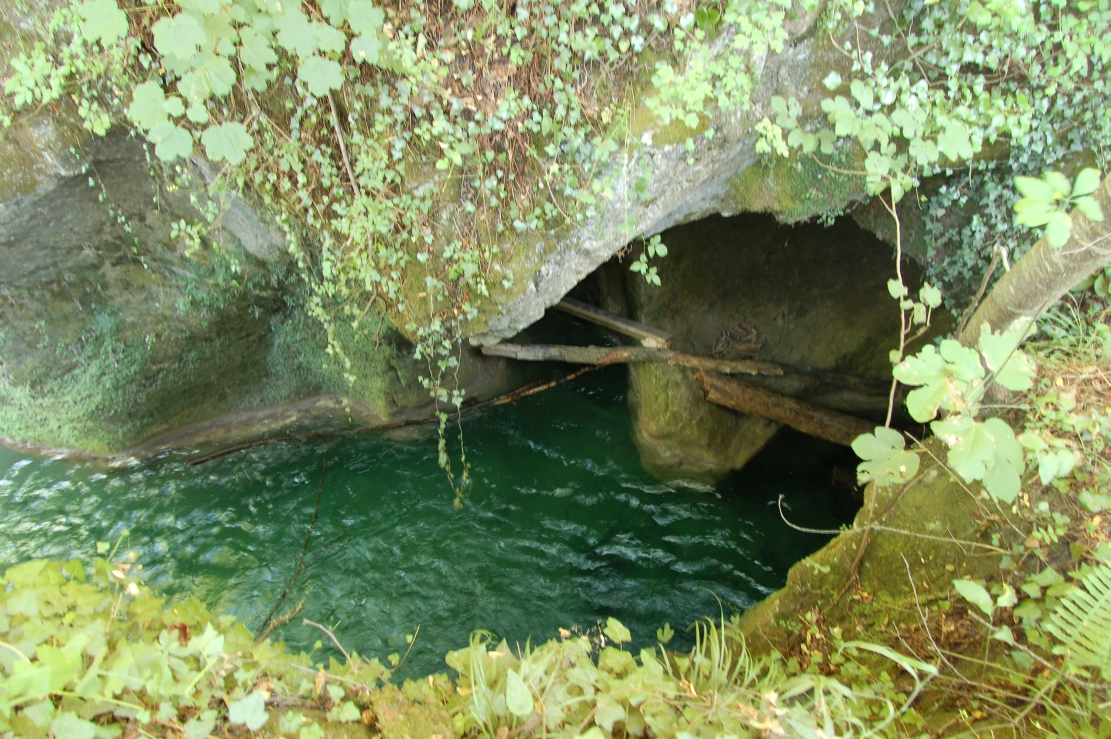

Location
- Country: Italy

Physical characteristics
- Source
  - location: Maiella National Park, near Serramonacesca
  - elevation: 1,000 m (3,300 ft)
- Mouth: Adriatic Sea
  - location: Francavilla al Mare
  - coordinates: 42.4275°N 14.2826°E
  - elevation: 0 m (0 ft)
- Length: 45 km (28 mi)

The Alento is a river in Italy. It is located in the Abruzzo region of southern Italy. Its source is located in Maiella National Park in the province of Pescara.

== Geography ==
Originated in the municipality of Serramonacesca, in the province of Pescara, the river crosses the border into the province of Chieti and flows through the municipalities of Roccamontepiano, Casalincontrada, Bucchianico, Chieti, Ripa Teatina and Francavilla al Mare. Its mouth is on the Adriatic Sea, in the middle of Francavilla.
