= Maurizio Colasanti =

Italian conductor and composer

Maurizio Colasanti is an Italian conductor and composer.

== Biography ==
At the age of 5 he began studying music with maestro Mimì De Renzis; just a year later he held his first solo concert with the band from his town, Pretoro. He graduated with top marks and honors from the L.D'Annunzio Conservatory of Music in Pescara. Subsequently he graduated "Cum Laude" in theoretical philosophy at the D'Annunzio University of Chieti–Pescara University.

His musical inclinations and interests led him to conduct the 20th century and contemporary repertoire of authors such as: Ottorino Respighi, Gian Francesco Malipiero, Luigi Dallapiccola, Maurice Ravel, Igor Stravinsky, Arnold Schoenberg, Barbara Kaszuba, Philip Glass, Arvo Pärt, Steve Reich, Karlheinz Stockhausen, Krzysztof Penderecki, Sofija Asgatovna Gubajdulina, George Enescu, Bruno Maderna. Active in opera, he has directed major titles in both Italian, German and English, including: (Salome) by Richard Strauss, (The Rape of Lucretia) by Benjamin Britten, Les enfants terribles, by Philip Glass. He has collaborated with musicians such as: Uto Ughi, Aaron Rosand, Félix Ayo, Yamandu Costa, Anthony Braxton, Gunther Schuller, Georg Friedrich Haas, Andersen Viana, Paul Badura-Skoda, Susanna Rigacci, and directors such as: Sergio Castellitto, Enzo Decaro, Maurizio Di Mattia, Thomas Moschopoulos, Renato Bonajuto.

He has performed at important international concert institutions: Carnegie Hall, Royal Academy of Music, Teatro dell'Opera Di Roma, Melba Hall (Melbourne), Arts House (Singapore), Teatro Petruzzelli, Arts Center of Seoul, Smetana Hall (Prague), Kolorak Hall (Belgrade), Lotte Concert Hall (Seoul). In 2013 he was awarded the Giuseppe Dell'Orefice Prize.

As a composer he has composed symphonic works and incidental music for theater and television.

He is the author of the essay La Musica è Sfinita published by ExCogita, Milan 2019.

== Literary Works ==
- La Musica è sfinita, ed. Excogita, Milano 2019. ISBN 9788899499341
- Tre Racconti per il Teatro, Chiaredizioni, Chieti 2020. ISBN 9788885561236

== Discography ==
- Nineteen eighty five, Ed. Routenote Ltd. (USA), 1985. Maurizio Colasanti composer.
- W. A. Mozart, Divertimenti, I Fiati Italiani AA690131
- W. A. Mozart, Masonic Music AA 690070
- F. Danzi, Quintetti, AA690117
- F. V. Krommer, L. Kotzeluch, A. Rosetti, I Solisti della Scala
- Virtù e Amore, Tactus TC 690003, 2021
- J. Triebensee, Triebensee, AA69005 I Fiati Italiani, Maurizio Colasanti conduct.
- M. Colasanti, Metaverse First Maurizio Colasanti composer, 2022.
- M. Colasanti, Metaverse Second Maurizio Colasanti composer, 2022.
- Northern Lights, Ed. Routenote Ltd (USA) 2017
- Dasein, Ed. Routenote Ltd (USA) 2022, Maurizio Colasanti composer
- Born under the stars, Ed. Routenote Ltd. (USA) 2023 Maurizio Colasanti composer.
