= Villamagna =

- Comune
- Comune di Villamagna
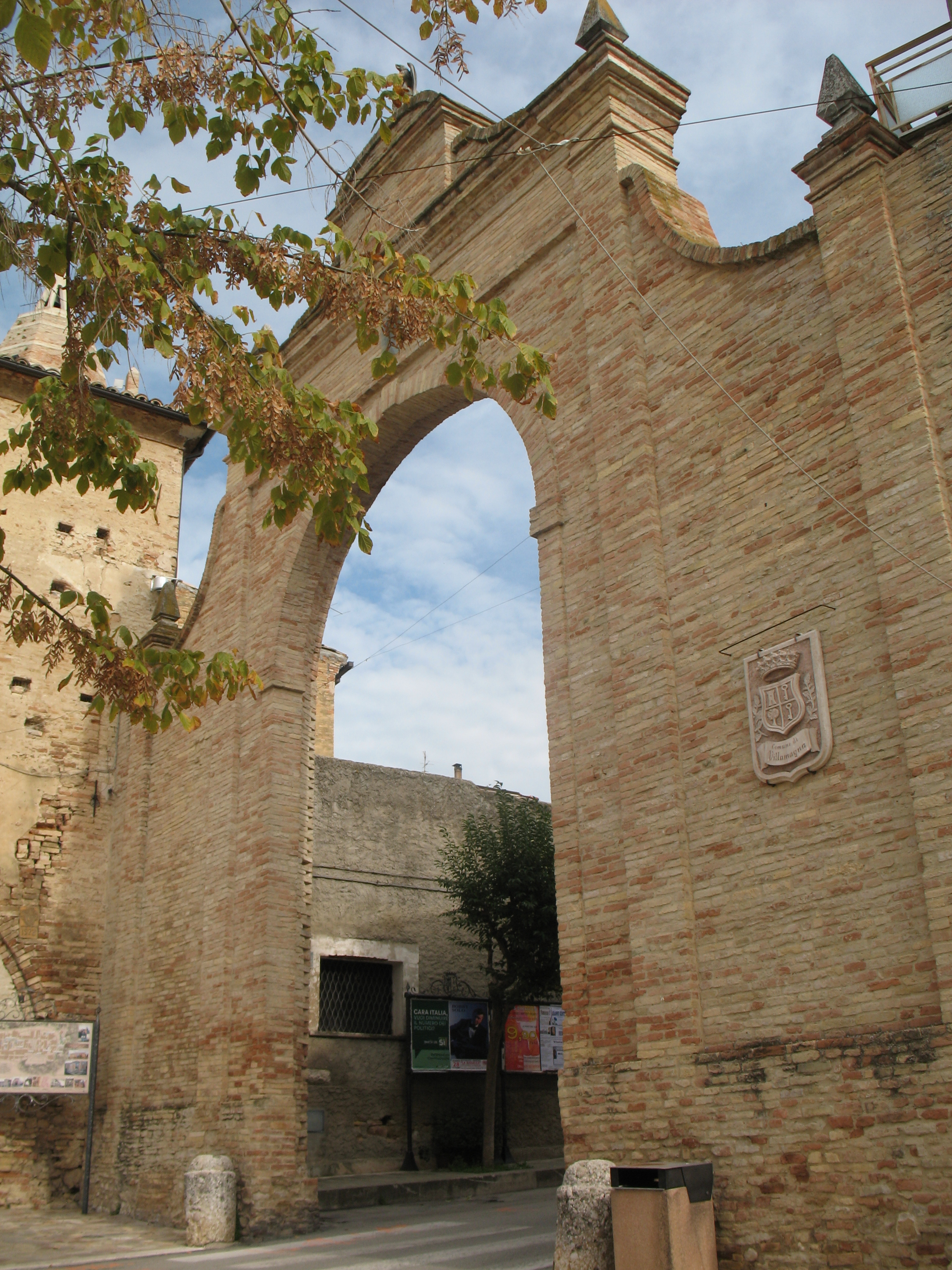

- Location within Italy Location within Abruzzo
- Coordinates: 42°20′N 14°14′E
- Country: Italy
- Region: Abruzzo
- Province: Chieti (CH)
- Frazioni: Innesto, Pian di Mare, Serepenne

Government
  - Mayor: Renato Giovanni Sisofo

Area
  - Total: 12.73 km^{2} (4.92 sq mi)
- Elevation: 255 m (837 ft)

Population (31 December 2021)
  - Total: 2,154
  - Density: 169.2/km^{2} (438.2/sq mi)
- Demonym: Villamagnesi
- Time zone: UTC+1 (CET)
  - Summer (DST): UTC+2 (CEST)
- Postal code: 66010
- Dialing code: 0871
- Patron saint: St. Margaret
- Saint day: 13 July
- Website: Official website

Villamagna is a comune and town in the province of Chieti in the Abruzzo region of south-eastern Italy.

== History ==
Originally a Roman settlement, the town's name derives from the Latin words villa ("farm") and magna ("large" or "important"). In the Middle Ages, its name was written as Villa Magna. Several bronze artefacts from the Roman necropolis near the town dating from the 5th century BC are held in Chieti's archaeological museum, "La Civitella".

After the fall of the Western Roman Empire, the settlement came into the possession of the Order of Saint Benedict, which built the Convent of San Severino here. The convent was abandoned in the 11th century, and the land and its settlement were ceded to the Normans. By 1461 it was under the control of Ferdinand I of Naples who gave Villamagna to Chieti, after which it came under a succession of local lords. Throughout the Middle Ages, the town was also subject to frequent raids by Saracen invaders which did not cease until 1566. The local legend is that the town's patron saint Santa Margherita miraculously appeared and turned back the Saracens at the city walls, an event reenacted each July in the town's main festival.

During the Italian Campaign, the American 88th Infantry Division took over Villamagna on the 13th of June 1944.

== Economy ==
Much of the area surrounding the town is used for growing wine grapes. Villamagna's red wine received its DOC appellation in 2011.
