= Casalincontrada =

- Comune
- Comune di Casalincontrada
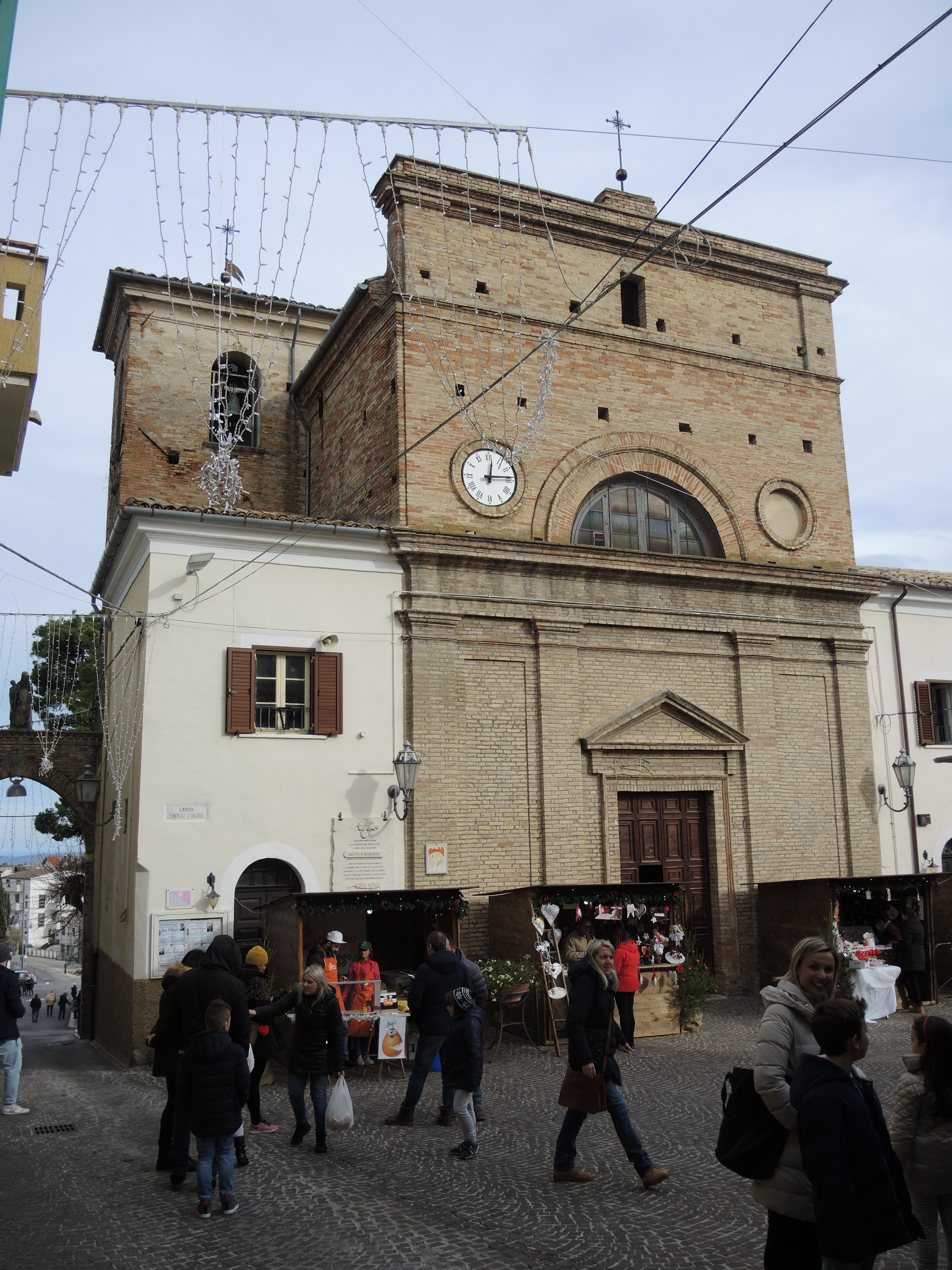

- Coat of arms

- Location within Italy Location within Abruzzo
- Coordinates: 42°18′N 14°8′E
- Country: Italy
- Region: Abruzzo
- Province: Chieti (CH)
- Frazioni: Aceto, Adriani, Ambrosetti, Brecciarola, Colle Petrano, Coppelli, Fellonice, Fontanelle, Iconicella, Malandra Nuova, Malandra Vecchia, San Lorenzo-Croce Della Madonna, San Marco, Sciabolone, Scrocchetti

Government
  - Mayor: Vincenzo Mammarella

Area
  - Total: 16 km^{2} (6.2 sq mi)
- Elevation: 333 m (1,093 ft)

Population (31 December 2017)
  - Total: 3,047
  - Density: 190/km^{2} (490/sq mi)
- Demonym: Casalesi
- Time zone: UTC+1 (CET)
  - Summer (DST): UTC+2 (CEST)
- Postal code: 66012
- Dialing code: 0871
- Website: Official website

Casalincontrada (Abruzzese: Lu Casèle, Lu Casale) is a comune and town in the province of Chieti in the Abruzzo region of central Italy.

It was founded in the 13th century by Frederick II of Hohenstaufen.

Sights include the church of Santo Stefano protomartire (14th century, later renovated in Baroque style), the church of Santa Maria delle Grazie (16th century) and the city gate (14th century).
