= Marco Reginelli =

- Born: Marco Reginelli; January 2, 1897; Nepezzano, Abruzzo, Italy
- Died: May 26, 1956 (aged 59); Baltimore, Maryland, U.S.
- Resting place: Calvary Cemetery, Cherry Hill, New Jersey, U.S.
- Other names: Small Man
- Occupation: Mobster
- Allegiance: Philadelphia crime family

Marco Reginelli (January 2, 1897 – May 26, 1956), also known as "Small Man", was an Italian-American New Jersey mobster who became underboss of the Philadelphia crime family and operated a famous nightclub in Atlantic City, New Jersey. Reginelli's nickname came from his short stature.

== Early life ==
Reginelli was born in Nepezzano, in Abruzzo, Italy in 1897. He immigrated to the United States in 1914, after his brother Nazareno. He first settled in an Italian-American community in Penns Grove, New Jersey, with many neighbors from Valle San Giovanni and Teramo. Many of these immigrants worked at the nearby DuPont chemical factory. In the 1930s, Reginelli moved to Camden, New Jersey, where he became a member of the Cosa Nostra.

== Criminal career ==
Reginelli's specialty was gambling and the numbers racket, A congressional committee once described Reginelli as "the top hoodlum in the Philadelphia-New Jersey area".

Reginelli eventually extended his influence to the resort area of Atlantic City. It is alleged that Reginelli may have had a hand in financing the 500 Club, a nightclub run by Paul "Skinny" D'Amato in Atlantic City from 1946 to 1973. In the early 1950s, the 500 Club frequently presented singer Dean Martin, who first performed with comedian and future partner Jerry Lewis at the club.

The Federal Government unsuccessfully tried to deport Reginelli to Italy. They also failed to block his citizenship application; Reginelli was finally naturalized as a U.S. citizen in June 1955, but was stripped of his citizenship in January 1956.

Marco Reginelli died from natural causes in 1956, at age 59. He's buried in the Calvary Cemetery in Cherry Hill, New Jersey. Reginelli's successor as underboss was Dominick Olivetto.
