= Villa Ripa =

Coordinates: 42°38′05″N 13°39′15″E

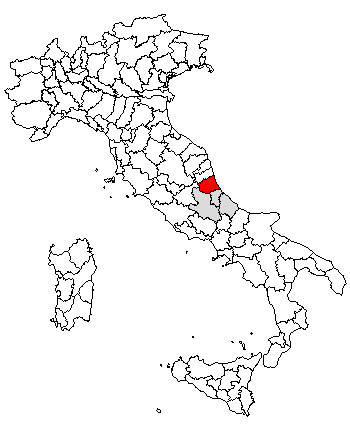
Location of Teramo in Italy

Villa Ripa is a village in the province of Teramo, in the Abruzzo region of central Italy. It is a frazione of the comune of Teramo and has a population of about 1000.

Up until the 18th century this small village went by the name "Ripa-Rattieri": "Ripa" meaning "river bank" referring to its physical location and "Rattieri" referring to the rich feudal family who since medieval times had owned much of the adjacent countryside. In more recent years the name of the village has gradually been transformed with word "Villa" meaning rural area, eventually added. The term "Rattieri" has become increasingly associated with the nearby village of Poggio Rattieri.

== Geography ==
The village lies about two miles east of Teramo, the provincial capital. The town sits on a hill dividing the Tordino Valley from the Rio Grande canal. The ancient historical district of Villa Ripa is located on the westerly slopes of this hilly domain. It is characterized by the presence of several small piazzas and open spaces surrounded by narrow sandstone houses the one on top of the other. The building materials for these dwelling were taken from the nearby Tordino river basin.

The area possesses a good number of scenic locations. There has been a strong emphasis in recent years to develop the area in such a way so as blend newer buildings with pre-existing historical structures. In this way the harmony between the two has been rather well preserved.

The most recently developed areas were put into place after the Second World War and sit beyond the village's bell tower to the east. A second building boom occurred in the 1980s with the construction of several housing clusters and apartment-type buildings along the Italian State Highway 80 (SS 80). Among these are a number of buildings designated for low income families. The village hosts a small nursery school which serves not only the residents of Villa Ripa but also those from several small surrounding communities.

== History ==
Several historically important artifacts have been discovered in the area of Villa Ripa. One of these is the remains of an ancient bridge that once crossed the Tordino River. In all likelihood, this bridge stood as part of a Roman road constructed by the powerful Turchi family. A mill in this area carried the name of this family.

In one corner of Villa Ripa known as Ponte a Porti there is a small church dedicated to the Madonna. Nearby was found a cylindrical boundary stone, also of Roman origin. The markings show this area once served as a transit point for people, animals, and goods that made their way from the mountain areas to the nearby city of Teramo. On the trail leading upwards to the overlooking hill called Caselle were uncovered several earthenware terracotta pieces along with coins from the late Roman era.

The first document citing Villa Ripa dates back to the year 1178, this being a listing of the landholdings under the jurisdiction of Attone, who at the time was the bishop of Teramo. This decree demonstrates that the history of Villa Ripa has long been intertwined with that of nearby Teramo, and the Diocese of Teramo-Atri. Portions of these documents indicate that the lay jurisdiction and administration of Villa Ripa was entrusted to powerful local families who in turn exercised the power bequeathed to them. Somewhat later, the land was overseen jointly by the Catholic Church in collaboration with several dukes and counts who were closely connected via feudal ties with the kings and queens residing in Naples. One very important ducal document attributed to Giosia d'Aqcuaviva dates to 1424 and gives confirmation to fact that Villa Ripa was at that time incorporated into the Commune (at that time referred to as the "university") of Teramo.

In 1607 the new parish church, located in the center of the village, was consecrated. It was dedicated to Saint Martin of Tours with a festival in his honor taking place every year on 11 November. Prior to this time another church likely existed at a lower elevation on the border of the Tordino plain. This church on the Tordino plain, along with a small church in the neighboring village Rocciano on an adjacent hill, constituted one united church parish. The church of Saint Martin and the accompanying bell tower was renovated in the years 1755, 1762, 1852, 1968 and, most recently, in 2007.
