= Museo archeologico Francesco Savini =

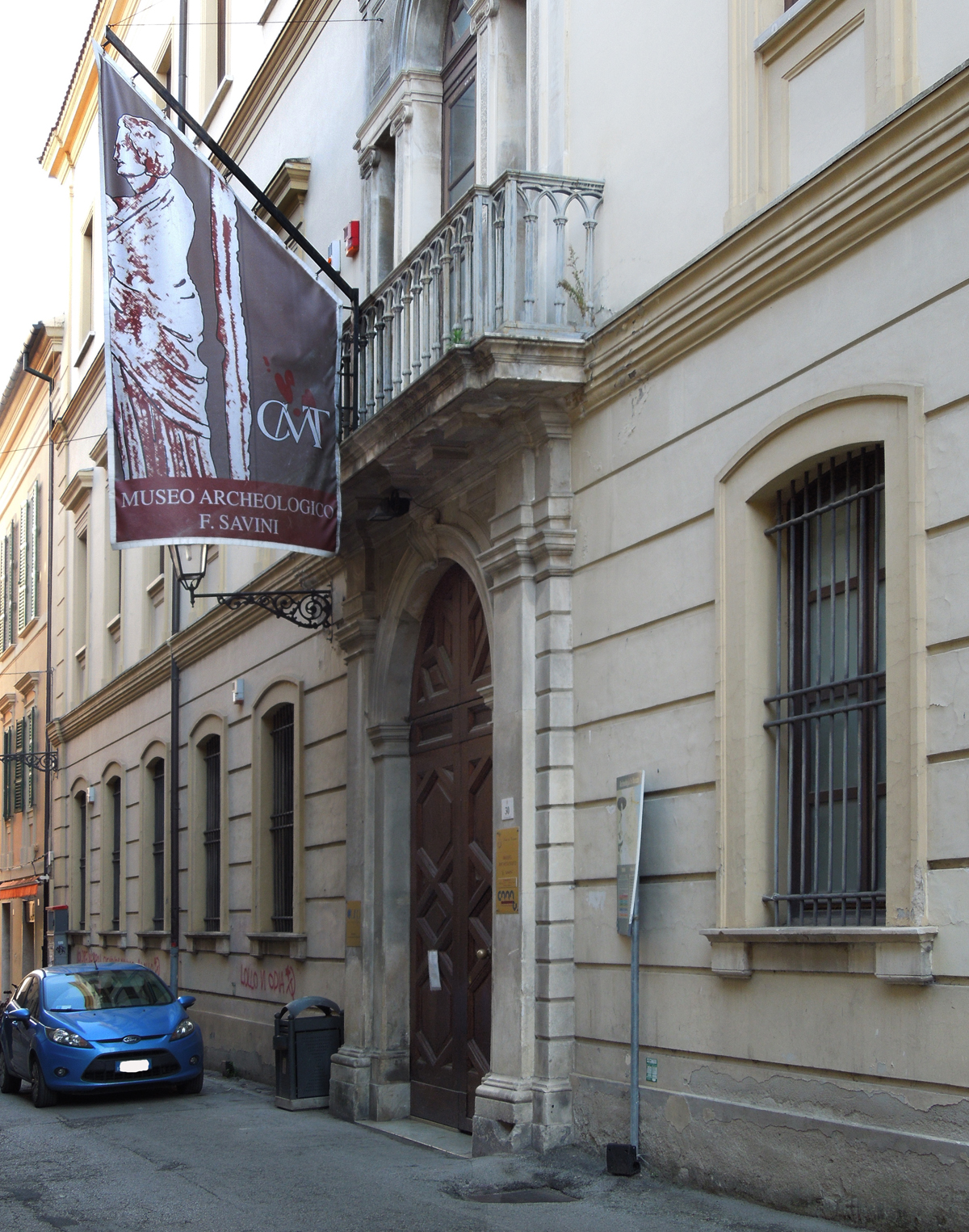
- Museo archeologico Francesco Savini

- Location within Abruzzo
- Location: Teramo
- Coordinates: 42°39′33.18″N 13°42′5.61″E
- Type: Archaeology museum

Museo archeologico Francesco Savini (Italian for Archaeology Museum Francesco Savini) is an archaeology museum in Teramo, Abruzzo.

== History ==
The building that houses the museum has changed its use several times over the centuries. It stands on an area built in the 13th century. In 1613, the first transformations occurred when internal works began for the construction of the church dedicated to St. Charles, to which a convent was added, which in 1742 was transformed into an orphanage. Once, as recalled by Niccola Palma, the place of worship was also known as the "Chapel of the Conservatory of the Orphans of St. Charles." Later, in 1833, the building underwent a series of restorations, and in 1842, it was expanded. In 1878, the orphanage was relocated, and the building was destined to become the Palazzo del Tribunale.

== Description ==
Owned by the local municipal administration and established in 1997, it houses the most extensive local exhibition of ancient artifacts, with items cataloged from prehistory to the classical age, and also includes works and artifacts dating up to the end of the 18th century and beyond. Within the Sistema Museale Città di Teramo (also known by the acronym CMT, i.e., Civici Musei Teramo), it is the central hub of the organization that groups together archaeological sites and other museums in the center of Abruzzo. These include the Pinacoteca civica and the sites of the Roman theater, the Roman amphitheater, the domus of Torre Bruciata, the domus of Largo Madonna delle Grazie, and the Necropoli di Ponte Messato.

The dedication to Francesco Savini honors the figure of the Teramo historian, archaeologist, and paleographer who concentrated his research interests in the geographic area of Teramo in Abruzzo.

=== Museum Layout ===
The exhibition space of the Teramo museum offers an overview of the local territory from prehistory to the Middle Ages, up to the Renaissance.

It is divided into two sections:

- On the ground floor are the rooms that house artifacts dated from the origins of the Roman settlement to the development of the city in the Early Middle Ages, tracing the period from the 12th century BC to the 7th century AD. This section gathers archaeological evidence from the habitation, necropolises of Teramo, public buildings like the theater, amphitheater, and Roman domus such as the Mosaic of the Lion. Additionally, there are some Roman marble sculptures and a bust of Septimius Severus.
- On the first floor are displays from prehistory to the medieval period, reconstructing the history of the territory of the Praetutii and the Piceni. Many materials come from caves in the area (Sant'Angelo cave in Civitella del Tronto) and the protohistoric necropolises of Ripoli, Tortoreto, and Campovalano, from Roman villas in the sites of Basciano, Giulianova, Pagliaroli, and Tortoreto. This space also addresses medieval ceramic production and Teramo's Romanesque architecture. One room contains the terracotta statues from the Nymphaeum of Tortoreto, discovered in 1956, and a fragment of a sculptural group depicting the blinding of Polyphemus. Other sculptures include the muses: Calliope, Euterpe, and Erato.

On the top floor of the museum, some documents from the city's history are preserved, coming from the Municipal Historical Archive.

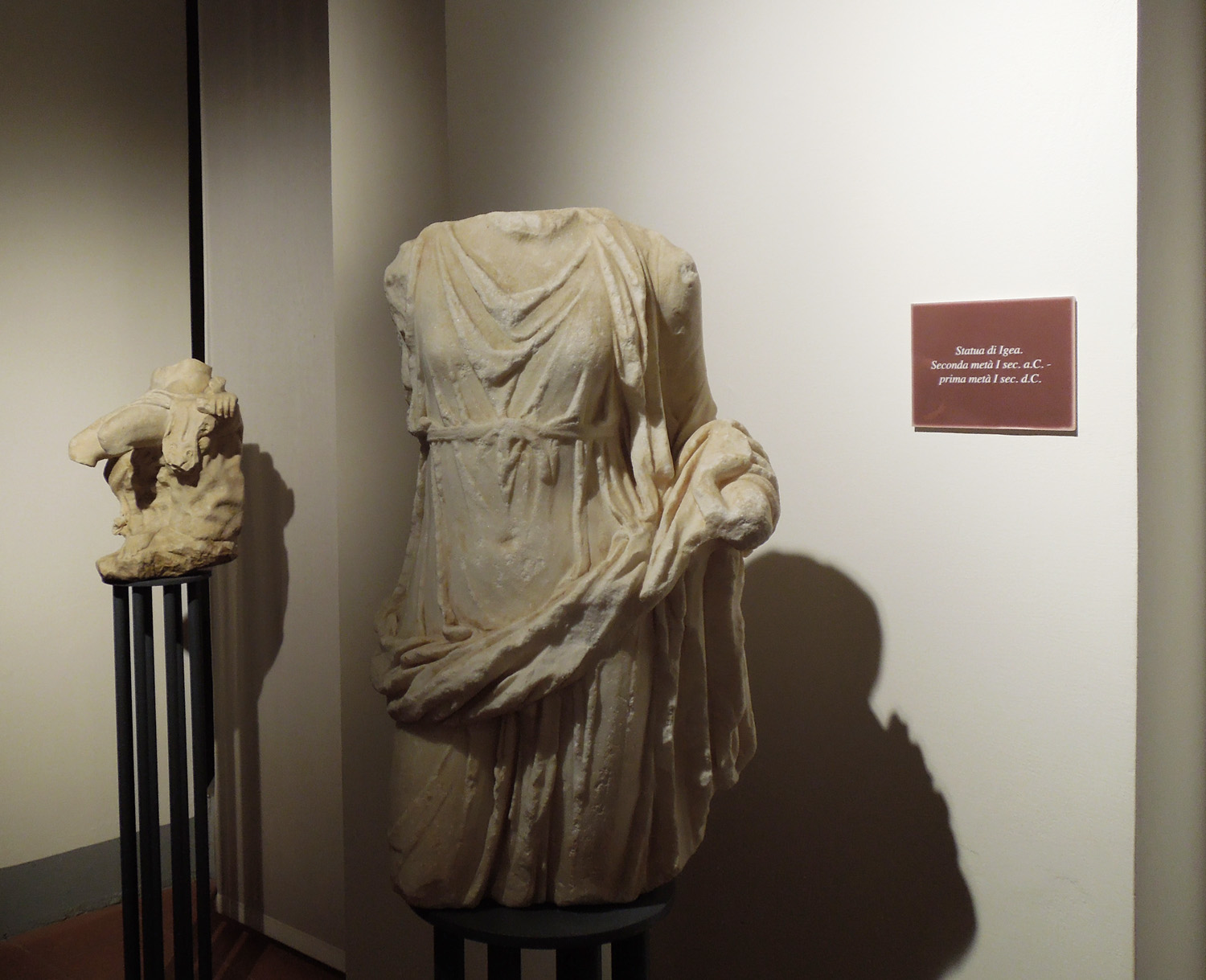
Statue of Hygieia

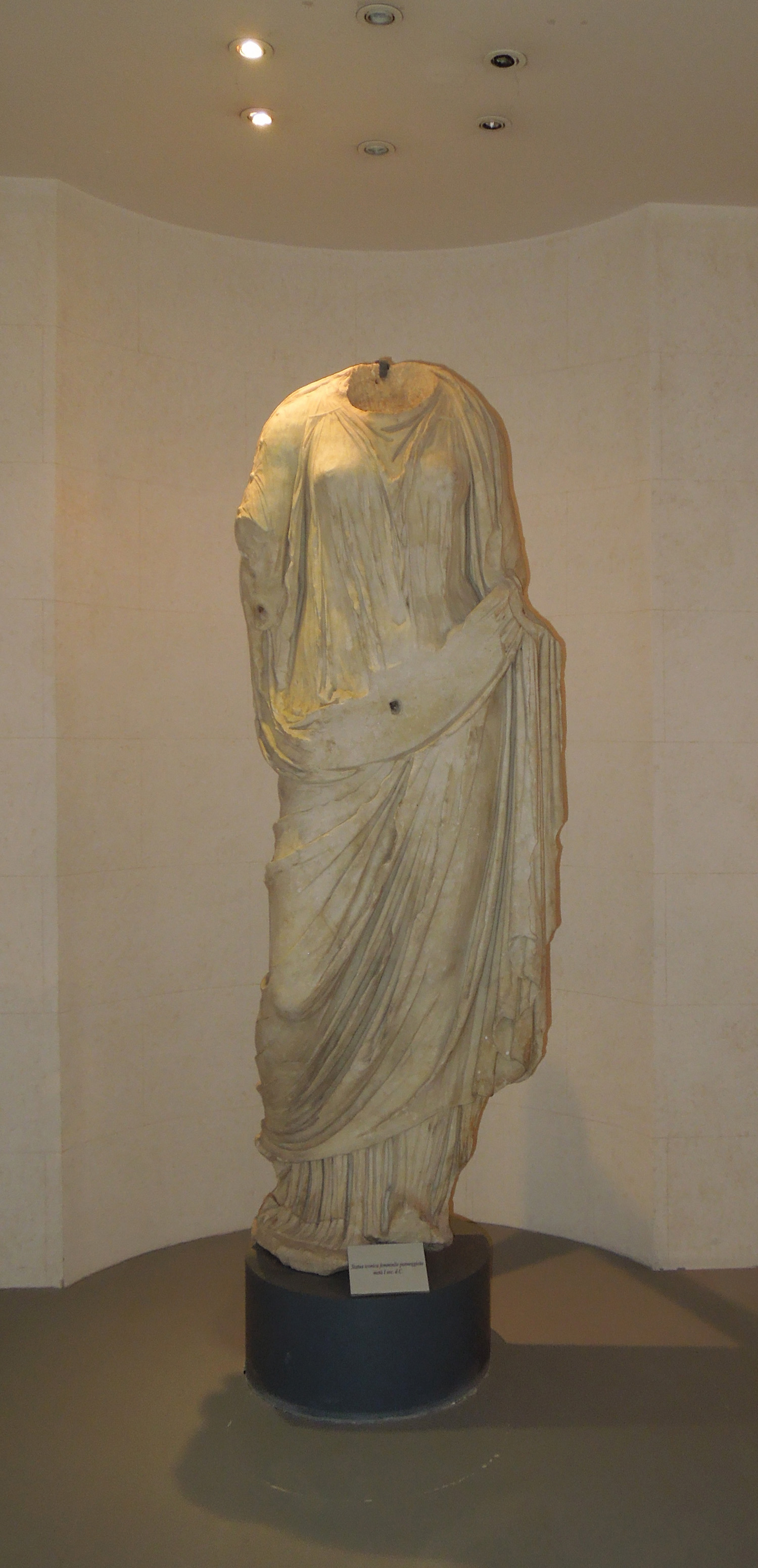
Headless marble statue, representing a muse, from the site of the Roman Theater of Teramo, probably used in the sculptural decoration of the front scene.

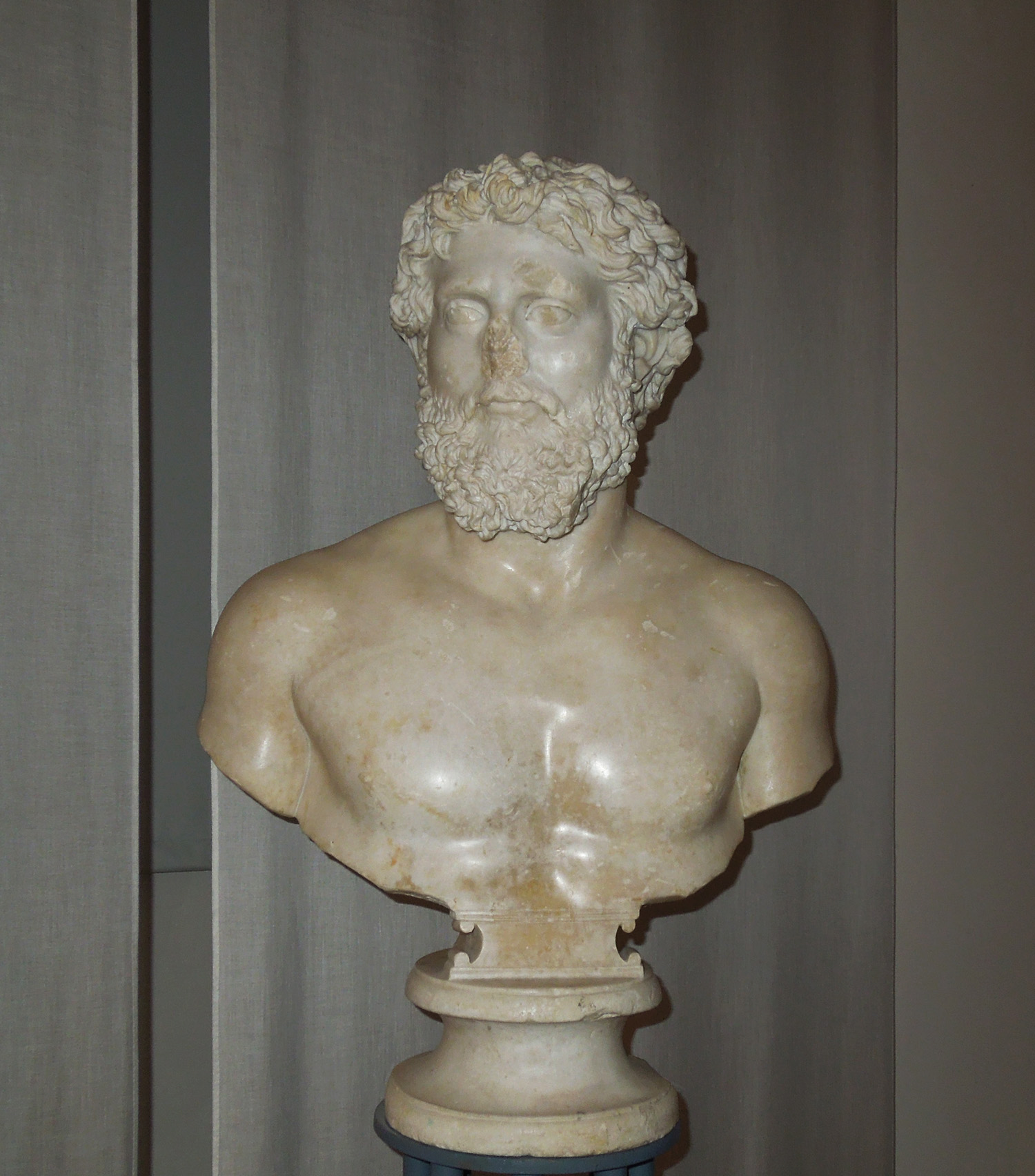
Bust of Septimius Severus, made towards the end of the 2nd century AD.

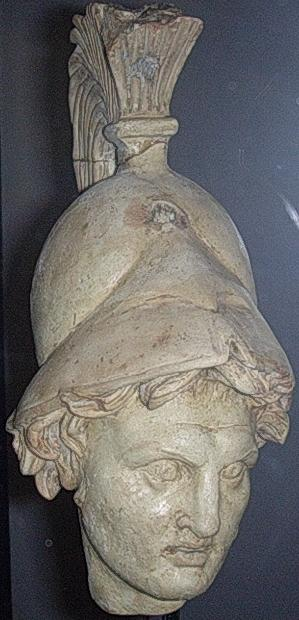
Helmeted head of a warrior from the Sanctuary of Jupiter at Pagliaroli of Cortino

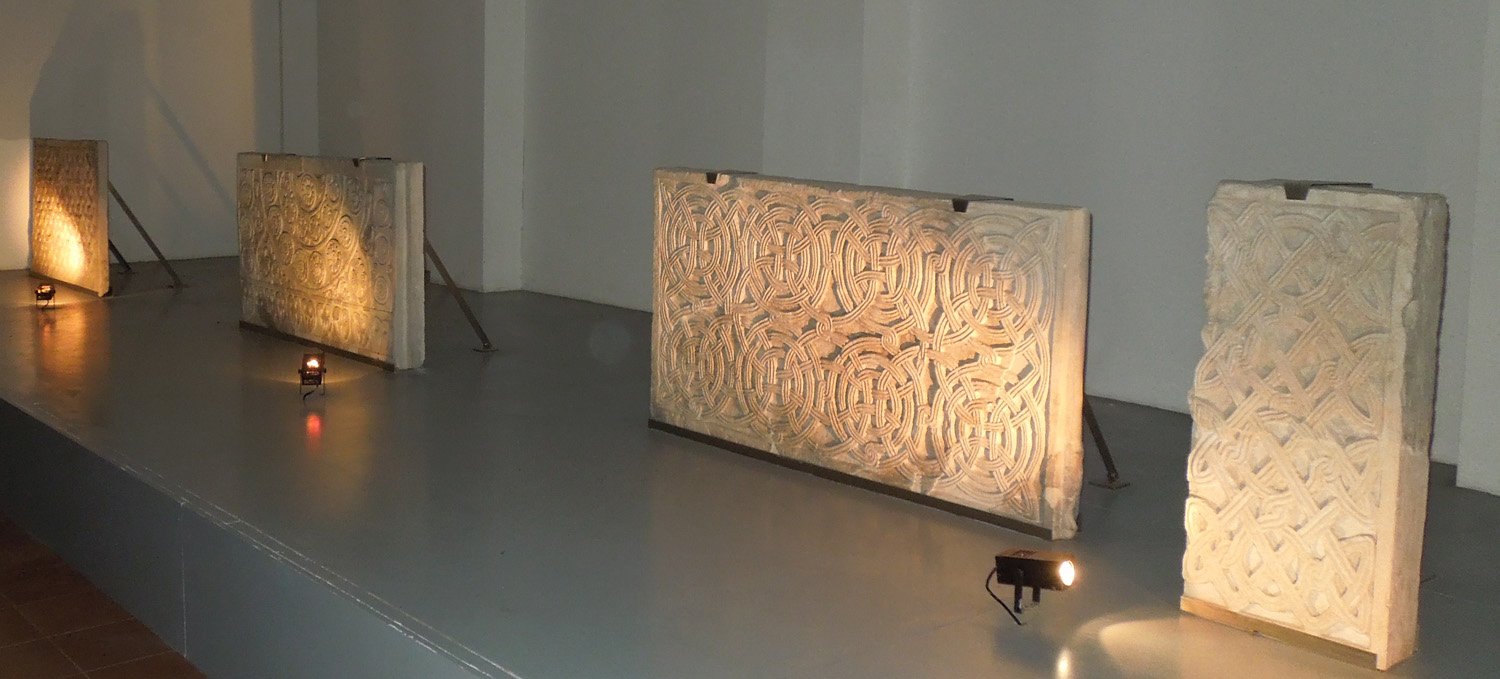
Plutei from the Church of Santa Maria Aprutiensis

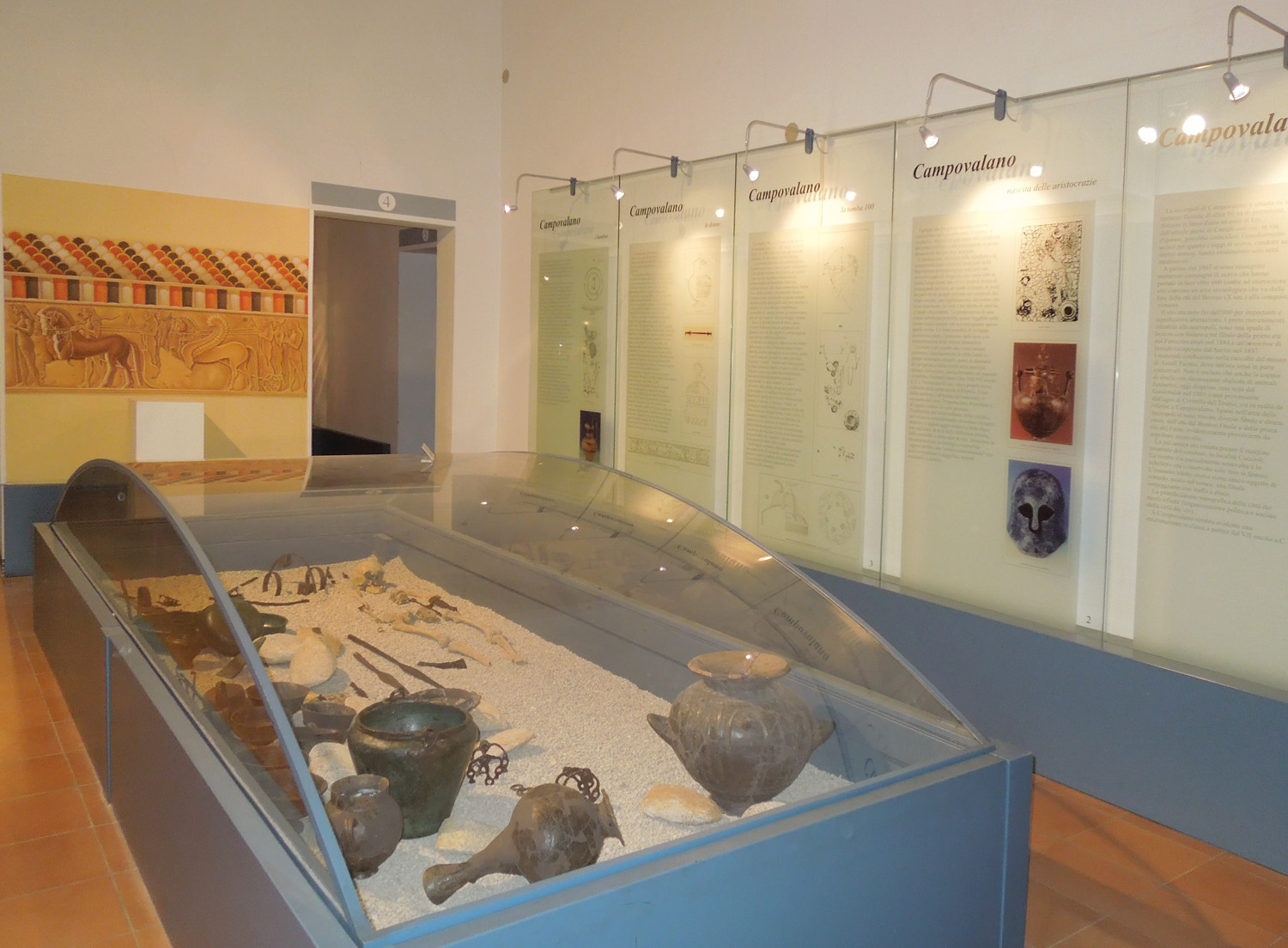
Room dedicated to the exhibition of the artifacts and funerary items from a tomb found at the necropolis of Campovalano

=== Museum Activities ===
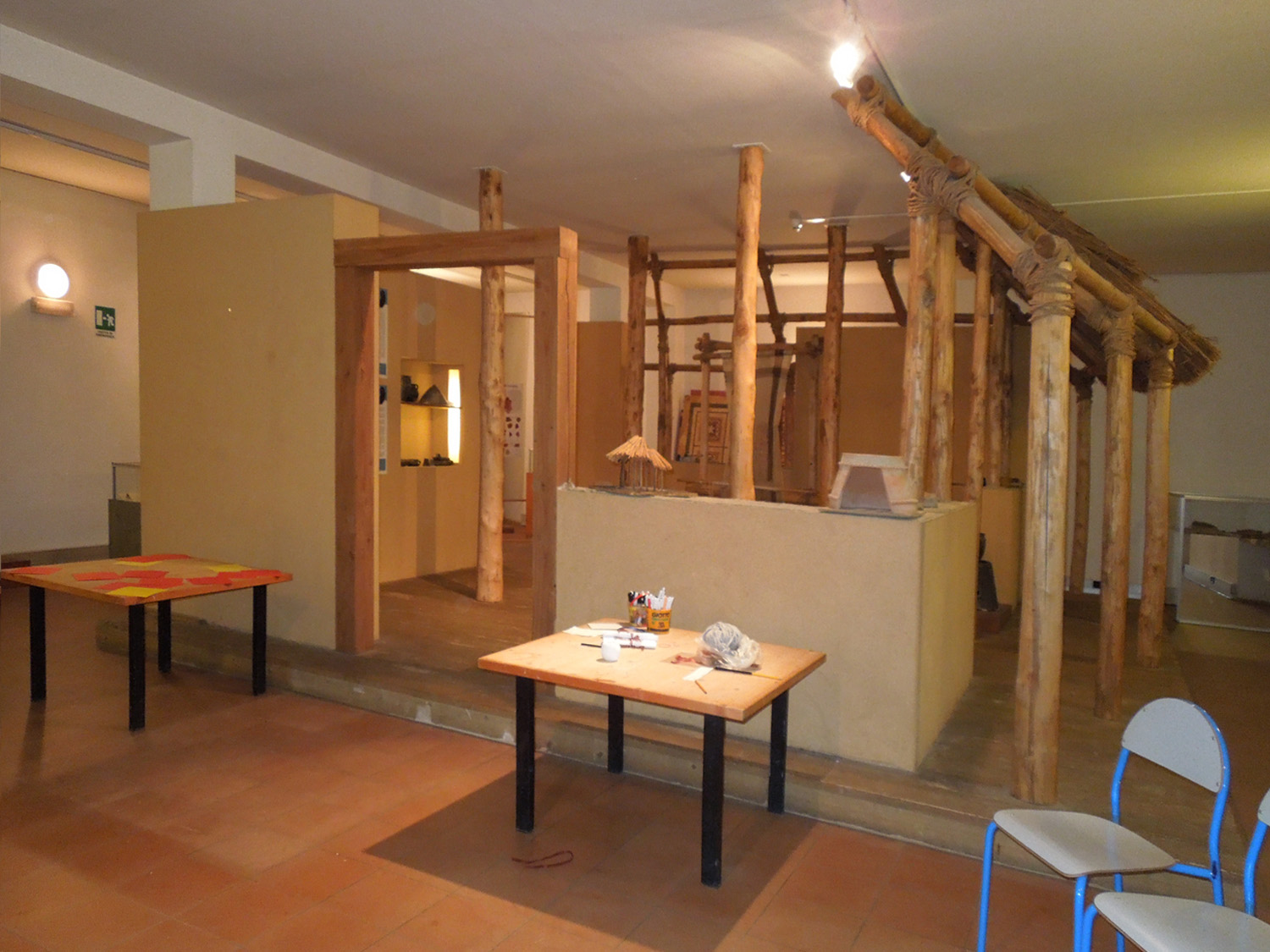
Educational workshop

In addition to the exhibition path, the museum organizes educational workshops, temporary exhibitions, guided tours, and other activities.

=== Auditorium San Carlo ===
Inside the Savini museum is the San Carlo Auditorium, located in the space of the former Church or Chapel of the Conservatory of the Orphans of San Carlo. Also owned by the Teramo Municipal Administration, it covers an area of 175 m² and has a capacity of about 99 people. The auditorium also includes two rooms for technical equipment and instrumentation. It can be used for conferences, socio-cultural initiatives, seminars, theatrical performances, book presentations, concerts, and civil weddings.
