= Spiano =

Coordinates: 42°36′N 13°39′E

- Frazione
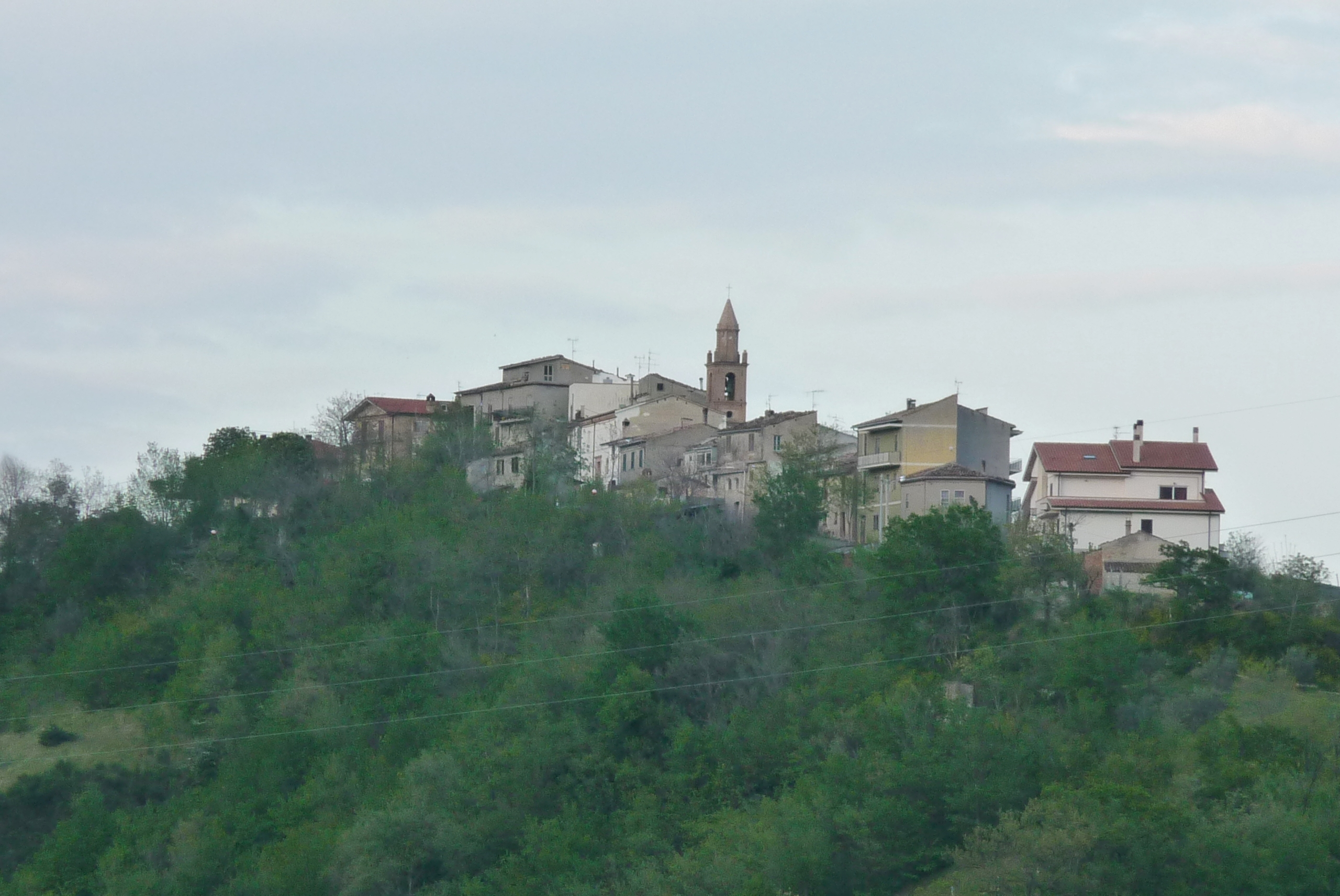
- Interactive map of Spiano
- Country: Italy
- Region: Abruzzo
- Province: Teramo
- Commune: Teramo
- Time zone: UTC+1 (CET)
  - Summer (DST): UTC+2 (CEST)

Spiano is a frazione (outlying area) of the commune of Teramo in the Abruzzo Region of Italy. It sits about seven miles from Teramo on a hill that overlooks both the Tordino and the Vomano valleys.

== Historical Origins ==
The name Spiano may have derived from the fact that the town finds itself at a point from which one can spy (in Italian "spiare") on the valleys which lie below. Others believe that the town takes its name from a location once known as Espano. Records show that in 1026 Guilbert of Teuton left his many holdings to the Bishop of Aprutino (Teramo). At the time these included land found near the city and villages of Penne, Pastori di Colledonico, Rossiano, Espano, Freniano, Colle de' Morelli, Rapina, Banio (today's Spiano to include the area of Santa Maria ad Balneum). In 1470 the city of Teramo acquired the hilltop fortifications of Frondarola and Spiano. The ownership and fates of these the castles located in Frondarola and Spiano have been linked over the centuries.

In the year 1804 Spiano, together with Fornarolo (Frondarola) made up what was then known as a Università. These political entities correspond most closely to what are called Italian communes in today's vocabulary. In 1813, the small università of Spiano was joined together with that of nearby Miano. As its population decreased, the entity later became what today is a "frazione" of the communal capital of Teramo.

== Sulfur Springs ==
Near Spiano are well known sulfur springs. The historian Niccola Palma notes that farmers have come to this site for many years in order to gather the crystallized salt formations that lie within. Nearby there once stood a small village by the name of "Bagno". A road leading to this area still carries this name and a nearby church, Saint Mary 'ad Balneum' was likely named with reference to these mineral deposits.

== Churches ==
In the year 1711 D. Giustino Natanni founded the Beneficial Society of Saints Joseph and Antonia Abate in the RC church of Spiano. This church is itself dedicated to Saint Mary ad Balneum and falls under the patronage of the parish of Teramo.

== Church of Saint Andrea ==
This church no longer exists although testimony to its existence can be found in the 1529 census records compiled by Francesco Chiericato. Most probably the church was later combined with that of nearby Spiano. A hill to the east of Spiano, Colle Sant'Andrea, still carries the name of the structure that once graced this location.

== Noted People ==
Amongst the most well known and illustrious people from Spiano is a Catholic nun, Sister Angela Cimini. She was a friend and traveling companion of Maria Felice Palaferri (1721-1758). Also of note is the monsignor Domenico Valeri, who served at the Bishop of Marsi for 28 years. In 1973 he renounced his bishopric in order to live a private life as a layman.

== Bibliography ==
- Giulio Di Nicola, Spiano, in La gazzetta di Teramo, Teramo, 22 maggio 1977. (in Italian)
- Franco Ariani, L'emigrante torna a casa. Ricordi di un paese che non c'è più, Teramo, Multimedia edizioni, 2006. (in Italian)
