= Valle Soprana =

Village in Teramo, Italy

Coordinates: 42°37′07″N 13°36′32″E

- Frazione
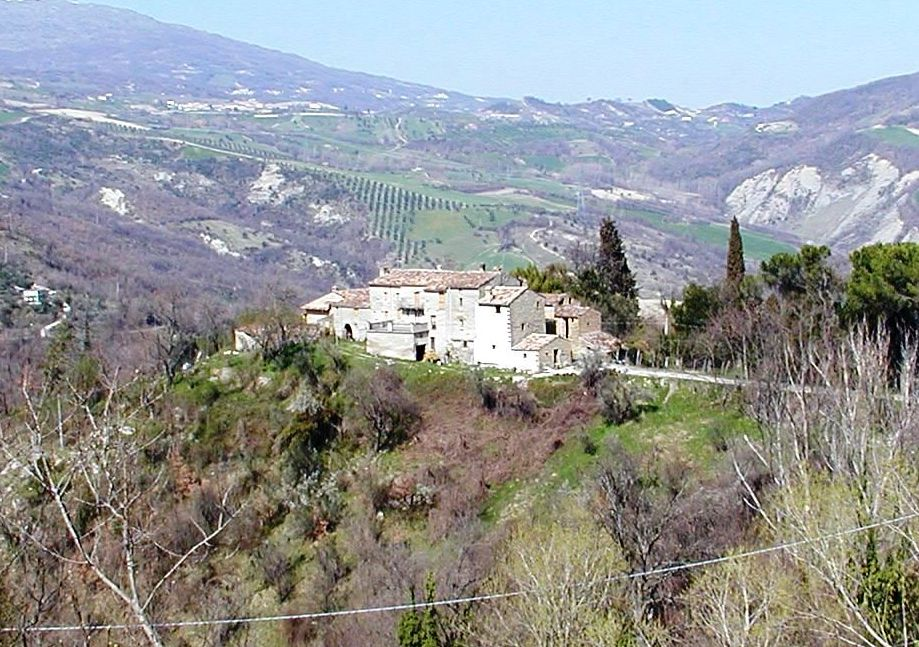
- View of Valle Soprana
- Interactive map of Valle Soprana
- Country: Italy
- Region: Abruzzo
- Province: Teramo
- Comune: Teramo
- Elevation: 520 m (1,710 ft)
- Time zone: UTC+1 (CET)
- Postal code: 64100
- Area code: 0861

Location of Teramo Province in Italy

Valle Soprana is a small village in the province of Teramo, in the Abruzzo region of central Italy. It is a frazione of the town of Teramo.

== Geography ==
Valle Soprana lies about six miles from Teramo, near the edge of the Gran Sasso National Park. Leading up to the ridge of the Asino Hills, the countryside surrounding Valle Soprana is characterized by a series of trails (tratturi) that in the past were used by shepherds in their yearly migration of sheep (transhumance) from the Abruzzo to the Apulia and Lazio regions of Italy.

Valle Soprana sits on the banks of a stream called the Fiumiciello, a small tributary of the Tordino river. The provincial road SP47, which runs from Frondarola to Pagliaroli, transverses the town.

== History ==
The village is known as the home of the Aceti family who have lived in the area for centuries and for many years owned and operated a small pharmacy in nearby Valle San Giovanni.
