= Frunti =

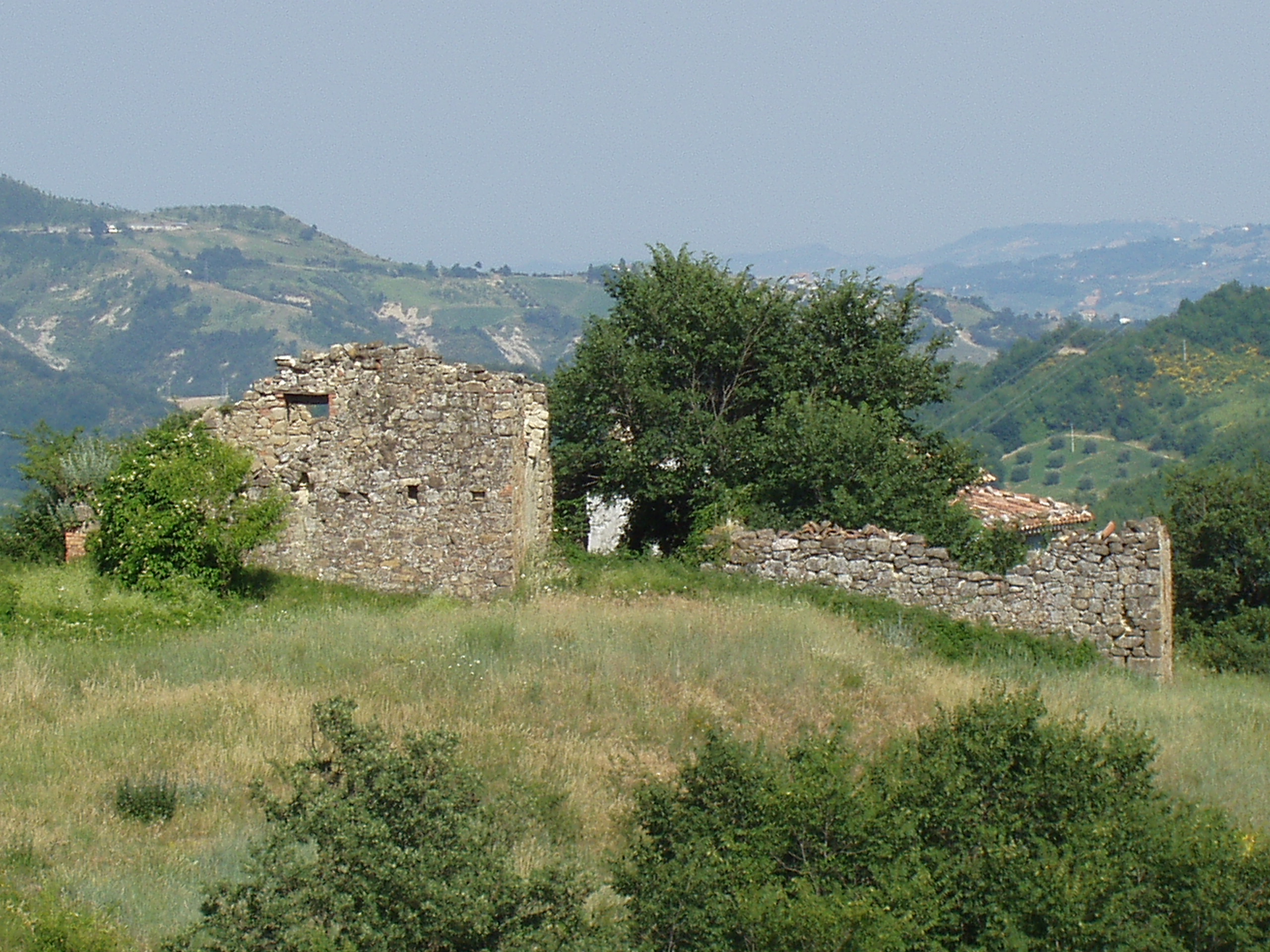
Remains of the abandoned village of Frunti

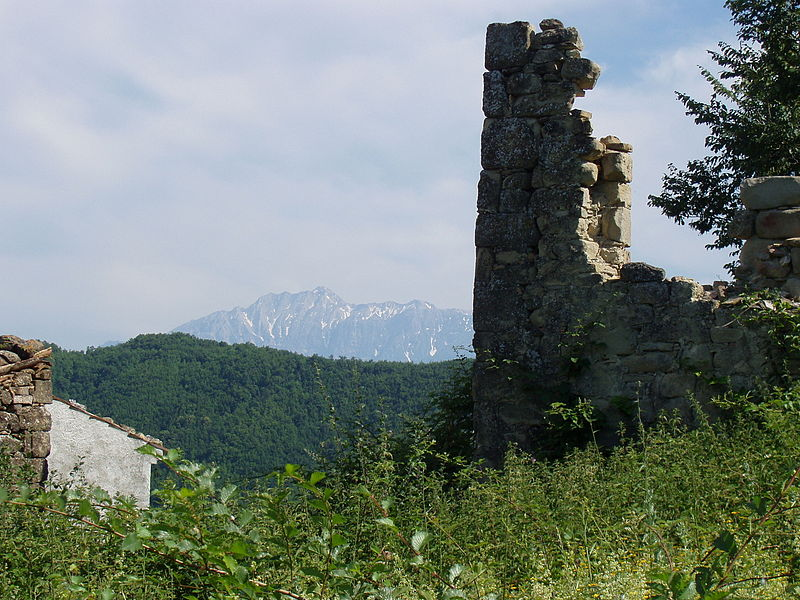
Remains of the abandoned village of Frunti

Frunti or Fronto was an ancient territorial and administrative jurisdiction located in the central part of Italy. The name Frunti exists to this day as a specific geographical location, although in medieval times the name referred to a larger, more expansive area of land. Frunti is located southwest of Teramo.

== History ==
Frunti's significance is well documented in the works of the historian Nicholas Palma as well as in research available from the Abruzzo Regional entity DAT (Documenti dell'Abruzzo Teramo; Documents of Teramo in Abruzzo). The site which today bears the name Frunti contains is completely abandoned and consists mainly of the ruins of pre-existing houses and domesticated farm animal dwellings.

Beginning at least in the year 1328, the feudal territory of Frunti (at the time more commonly referred to as "di Fronto") carried the privilege of the Forum. In subsequent years the area was governed for short periods by the patrons of a castle, Fornarolo (today Frondarola) which sits to the southwest. Also associated with Frunti were the communes (castrates) of Scalellis and Rocca di Padula, these later coming under the rule of Montagna di Roseto and more recently administrated by the commune of Cortino.

To the south of the area known today as Frunti, lies the ruins of an ancient Benedictine abbey, San Giovanni in Pergulis. References to the abbey are made in a Papal Bull of 1153 which stated that it belonged to the Chiesa Aprutina (Catholic Church Abruzzo). During medieval times the San Giovanni in Pergulis abbey enjoyed seigneurial rights in the surrounding area. The larger nearby village of Valle San Giovanni was also a thriving entity at this time and it is likely here where the Frunti governing signori (noble family members) lived.

In later times, Frunti came under the rule of Count, later Marquis, of Montorio where it remained until the breakup of the feudal states. In modern times much of the area of Frunti lies within the commune of Teramo.
