= Caprafico =

Caprafico may refer to:

- Caprafico, Chieti, a frazione in the Province of Chieti, Italy
- Caprafico, Teramo, a frazione in the Province of Teramo, Italy
