= Cona (Teramo) =

Quarter of Teramo, Italy

Coordinates: 42°39′15″N 13°41′2″E

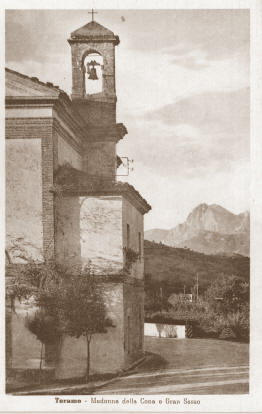
Cona

Cona is a quarter of Teramo, central Italy. It takes its name from the presence of the local church, Madonna della Cona. The Madonna della Cona is a religious symbol of abundance and fertility with a festival the first Sunday in September that is celebrated in her honor.

== Overview ==
Also located in this area is the important Italian Strada Statale 80 (State Highway 80), or SS80, which begins to the east in Giulianova and passes in a westerly direction to the city of L'Aquila. In doing so it transverses the Gran Sasso and the Capannelle Pass. In this area the SS80 passes through the Gran Sasso e Monti della Laga National Park. One stretch of this road has been rebaptized the Strada Maestra Grand Highway of the Gran Sasso and Monti della Laga National Park.

Quartiere Cona is a quiet and tranquil setting that is among the most populous of Teramo. In the year 2007, it had approximately 5,000 inhabitants. It is situated near the historical center city and is divided into five residential zones:

- Cona 1 (upland from the church and closest to the Teramo shopping district)
- Cona 2 (downhill from the church)
- Cona 3 (on the far side of a bridge which crosses the Messato stream)
- Fonte Baiano (a hilly region at the initial entrance to the zone)
- Piano Solare (a flat plane which descends from the Fonte Baiano to the lowest zonal area).

In the zone Cona 3, is located the Parco Archeologico (Archaeological Park). The ruins date back to time of the Roman Empire. Here are found the remains of a paved road, the Via Sacra d'Interamnia (Sacred Road of Teramo) surrounded by ancient monuments. Analogous to the famous Appia Antica (Appian Way) near Rome, this road also bore the Latin name Via Appia Teramana (Appian Road of Teramo).

== See also ==
- Teramo
- Colleparco
- Gammarana
- Piano della Lenta
