= Garrano Basso =

Coordinates: 42°041′056″N 13°039′048″E

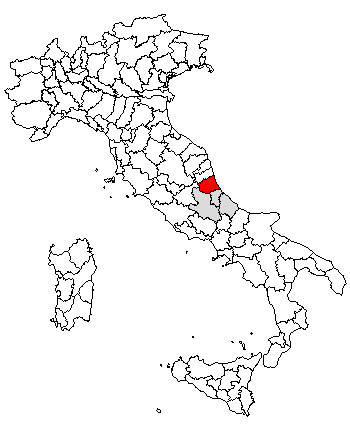
Location of the province of Teramo

Garrano Basso is a village in the province of Teramo. This province is located in the Abruzzo region of Italy. The village, which had a population of 109 as of 2001, is a frazione (part) of the city of Teramo. Relative to the city center, the village is 7.49 kilometers northwest, via the SS81 Piceno-Aprutina state road.

== History ==
There is a Catholic church in the village, the Chiesa Santa Maria ad Melatinum, which dates back to the 15th century and is located on a hill towards Garrano Alto, an adjacent village slightly closer to Gran Sasso. The word Melatinum refers to the Melatini, who were an influential family of Lombard origin that had established themselves as the feudal rulers of the Teramo area beginning in the 13th century. This church suffered some non-critical structural damage during an earthquake in April 2009.

Some of the roads in Garrano Basso are still unpaved and the old building that once housed an elementary school for the village has remained empty for years. In May 1993, the Santa Maria Madre della Fiducia rehabilitation center for drug-addicted youth was opened here by the Comunita` Mondo Nuovo which operates several such centers in Abruzzo. In 2005 new streetlights were installed by the municipal government of the Comune of Teramo from the village central plaza leading up the road to the church.
