= Interamnia World Cup =

Coordinates: 42°39′32″N 13°42′10″E

- Founded: 1972
- Region: Teramo

The Interamnia World Cup run by a Handball organisation in Italy. It is one of the largest international handball competitions established and it is contested by men's and women's club teams from all over the world. It takes place every year during the first week of July in Teramo in Italy. In the year (2023) it has reached the 50th edition.
