= Sant'Atto =

Coordinates: 42°42′28″N 13°48′28″E

Sant'Atto (Teramo)
- Frazione
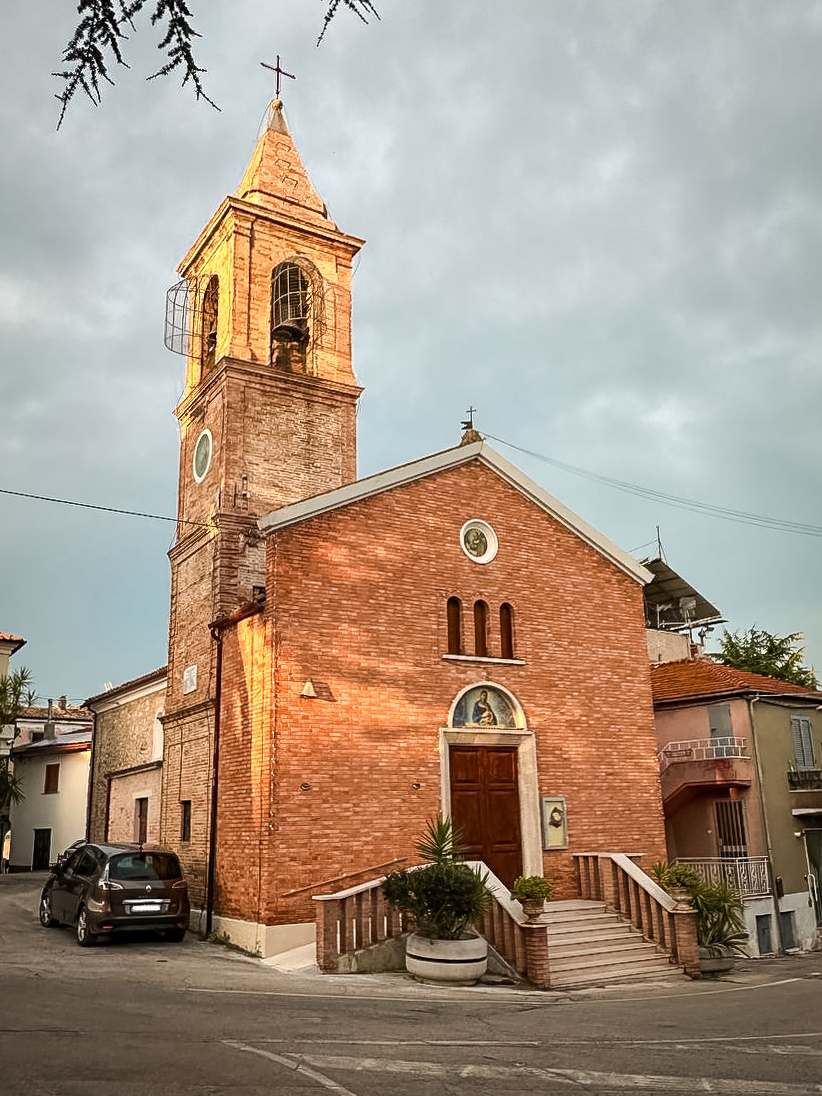
- Interactive map of Sant'Atto (Teramo)
- Country: Italy
- Region: Abruzzo
- Province: Teramo
- Commune: Teramo
- Time zone: UTC+1 (CET)
  - Summer (DST): UTC+2 (CEST)

Sant'Atto (Teramo) is a frazione in the Province of Teramo in the Abruzzo region of Italy.
