= Tofo-Sant'Eleuterio =

- Frazione
- Location of Tofo-Sant'Eleuterio in Italy
- Coordinates: 42°42′57″N 13°45′05″E
- Country: Italy
- Region: Abruzzo
- Province: Teramo (TE)
- Comune: Teramo
- Elevation: 250 m (820 ft)
- Demonym: tofesi
- Time zone: UTC+1 (CET)
  - Summer (DST): UTC+2 (CEST)
- Postal code: 64100
- Dialing code: 0861
- Patron saint: Saint Eleutherius

Tofo-Sant'Eleuterio is a small village in the province of Teramo, in the Abruzzo region of central Italy. It is a frazione of the comune of Teramo. The inhabitants are known as Tofesi.

== Geography ==
Tofo-Sant'Eleuterio lies about 10 km from Teramo, at an elevation of 250 m. It has two parts, Villa Tofo higher up, and Sant'Eleuterio below. The former is located on a hill from which one can see in the distance the Gran Sasso, the highest peak in the Apennine Mountains, as well as another peak, Montagna dei Fiori. According to tradition, Villa Tofo is named after the nearby tuff rocks. The latter village takes its name from its patron, Saint Eleutherius, the thirteenth pope. A church in the town is named in his honor.

About one mile from the village is the provincial road Fonte a Collina ("from the spring to the hill") which from Fiumicino (a village near San Nicolò a Tordino in the commune of Teramo) leads to Sant'Onofrio in the commune of Campli. The town is adjacent to a ridge of the Fiumicino torrent, a tributary on the left bank of the Tordino river.

== History ==
Historical records dating back to the 14th century document the presence of Benedictine Monastery near Tofo on the banks of the Fiumicino. Few traces of this dwelling remain.

Beginning in the early 20th century, Tofo-Sant'Eleuterio entered a period of significant development. During the fascist period an elementary school, which had been housed in a private home, was constructed. A church dedicated to the Immaculate Conception was constructed during the mid 1960s. The church is by no means grandiose and was constructed in large part through the hard labor and economic support of the local citizens. Portions of the building materials were taken from the ruins of a nearby colonial bishopric tribunal dwelling. Mario Cerino, from Monticelli (another village in the commune of Teramo), donated the land where the church now stands. Surveys, designs andgeneral contracting services were carried out under the auspices of Giovanni Di Felice.

In the 1960s the village began to industrialize more heavily.
