= Valle San Giovanni =

- Frazione
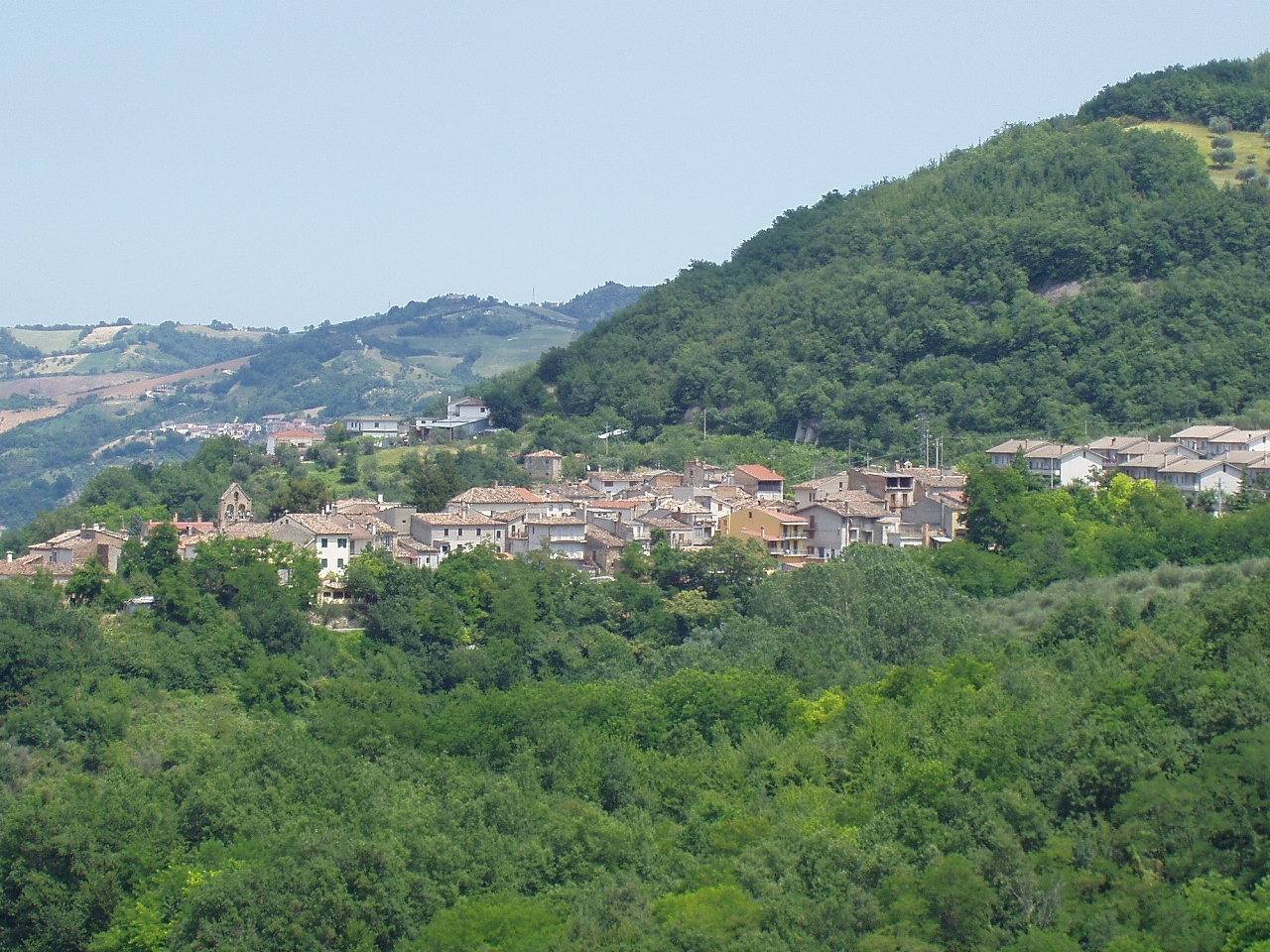
- Panoramic view

- Location of Valle San Giovanni in Italy
- Coordinates: 42°37′16″N 13°37′5″E
- Country: Italy
- Region: Abruzzo
- Province: Teramo (TE)
- Comune: Teramo
- Elevation: 460 m (1,510 ft)

Population (2010)
  - Total: 300
- Demonym: Vallaroli
- Time zone: UTC+1 (CET)
  - Summer (DST): UTC+2 (CEST)
- Postal code: 64100
- Dialing code: 0861
- Website: Official website

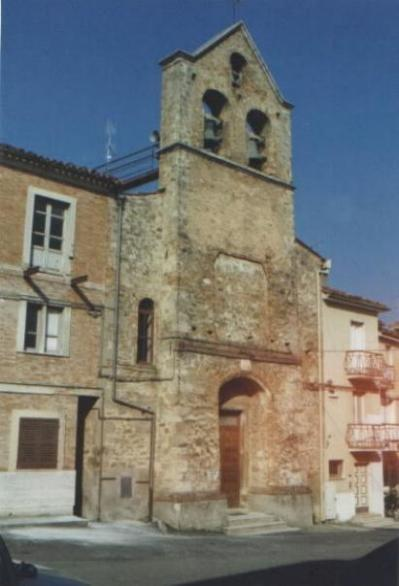
Church of Saint John

Valle San Giovanni is a small village in the province of Teramo, in the Abruzzo region of central Italy. It is a frazione of the town of Teramo.

== Geography ==
The village has a population of about 350 people and lies about six miles from Teramo. The Adriatic Sea and the Gran Sasso are about 25 km away. It sits in the Tordino Valley, near the spot where two small streams, the Lete and the Fiumicello, flow into the Tordino river.

Located off the main piazza, Largo della Chiesa, is Via del Casale. The residents of Valle San Giovanni call themselves "Vallaroli".

Adjacent to Valle San Giovanni are the nearby villages of Frondarola, Travazzano and Valle Soprana.

== History ==
According to some sources the town takes its name from a powerful Teramo family with the last name "Di Valle". Others claim that the name derives from its proximity to an ancient monastery, San Giovanni in Pergullis (Saint John amongst the Pergolae), a location surrounded by many vineyards.

Over the years, the history of Valle San Giovanni has been closely linked with two neighboring communities, Frunti, a feudal holding of the "De Frunto" family, and Teramo, with which there was an enduring reciprocal alliance. At one point Teramo briefly annexed Frunti leading to renewed efforts by it inhabitants to break these feudal ties and traditions. In 1338 the townspeople declared their independence from Teramo, thereby reaffirming their autonomous civil liberties. This arrangement lasted until 1457 when Frunti became part of the county Montorio al Vomano. In 1668 Frunti passed into the hands of the Count Crescenzio De Crescentiis. In the beginning of the 18th century Frunti became aligned with neighboring Valle San Giovanni, which at that time was becoming increasingly developed due to having annexed the surrounding church and vineyards of San Giovanni in Pergulis and to serving as a sheep herding way station. This great migration of sheep from Abruzzo to Puglia and Lazio was known as the transumanza. Valle San Giovanni sits on one such trail known as the San Quirico.

In the 16th and 17th centuries, Valle San Giovanni witnessed a number of brigand skirmishes, these arising from struggles over control of the surrounding forest areas. At least a few of these brigands were local townsfolk.

In the midst of these ongoing struggles, San Giovanni in Pergulis, the monastery on the outskirts of Valle San Giovanni, had a rapid and irreversible decline. In 1561 Pope Paul IV deeded these holdings, along with the remains of the old convent, to the collegiate church of Montorio al Vomano, with the understanding that they would be restored. The church did not restore the properties, which continued to deteriorate. In 1775 the church authorities of Montorio al Vomano ceded San Giovanni in Pergulis and all of its associated religious functions, to the main church of Valle San Giovanni, Madonna della Neve. The latter sits in the center of Valle San Giovanni, and takes its name, Madonna della Neve (Our Lady of Snow), from a legend in which a church was to be erected on the spot where a summer snowfall was to occur. Madonna della Neve is known for its frescoes dating to 1458. A religious festival held the first weekend in August of each year serves to commemorate its founding.

In 1603 the Marquis Baltassarre Caracciolo had three brigands executed in an effort to put an end to the ongoing rivalries arising at that time. In 1682, two groups of brigands fought for control of the land surrounding Valle San Giovanni. One such battle lasted six days and came to an end only when soldiers from Teramo were summoned to put an end to the conflict. A year later in 1683, the town was sacked and almost completely destroyed by Don Alfonso di Villaparte in an attempt to capture the famous brigand, Santuccio Di Froscia, who for years had been terrorizing the countryside.

In 1799 a group of soldiers from Valle San Giovanni, under the leadership of the brigand leader, Vincenzo Rolli, fought valiantly against the French occupying forces. In 1809 the French Napoleonic forces, who would rule for ten years under the Kingdom of Naples, chose Valle San Giovanni as the center of vast communal territory which included the ex feudal states of Frunti, Valle Piola, Abetemozzo, Borgonovo e Poggio Rattieri.

In the first half of the 19th century, coal deposits were discovered and mined very near the town. From the early 20th century onward, many of the citizens of Valle San Giovanni emigrated to New Jersey in the United States; Montreal, Quebec, Canada; and elsewhere in search of work. This served to further impoverish the small village and greatly reduced its population.

In 1868 the town (comune) of Cortino was administratively established and Valle San Giovanni came under the jurisdiction of Montorio al Vomano. In 1929 Valle San Giovanni separated from Montorio al Vomano and became a suburb (frazione) of Teramo.

According to local sources and histories, during the Second World War the grottoes located immediately above Valle San Giovanni served as places of refuge for the Italian partisans then battling the German forces.

== Noted natives and residents ==
- Santina "Mama Maria" Di Marco, American restaurateur, owner of Mama Maria Ristorante Italiano and hostess of a local Philadelphia television cooking show.
- Giuseppe Bracalente (AKA Giuseppe Bracale; AKA Joe Firpo), world boxing champion.
- Giuseppe Di Battista, founder and president of the Fiducie Canadienne-Italienne; after the Bank of America, this is the largest financial institution in the western hemisphere founded by an Italian.
