= Gammarana =

Coordinates: 42°39′52″N 13°43′14″E

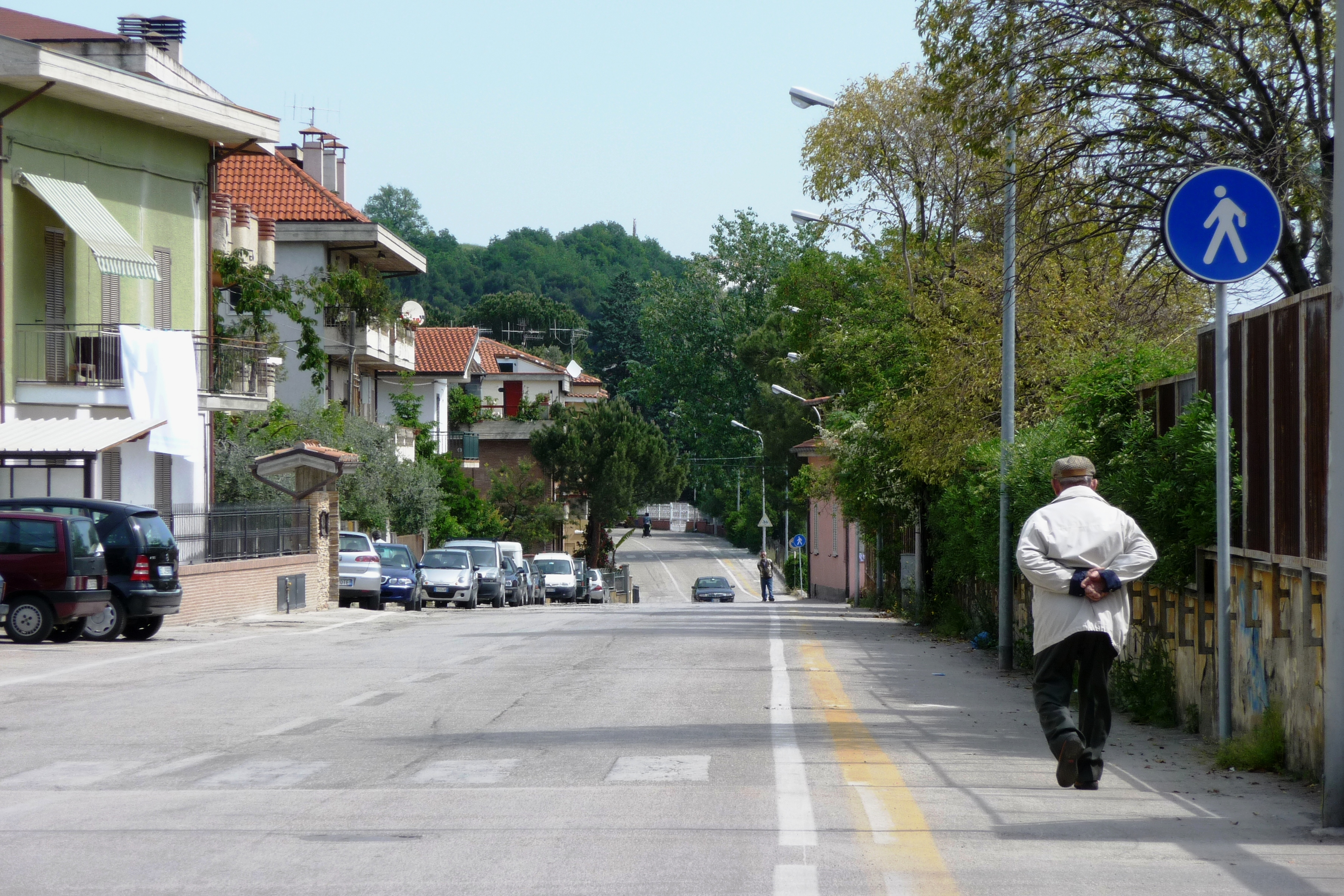

Gammarana is a neighborhood in the city of Teramo in Italy's Abruzzo region. It is located near the local railway station. In the 1960s a number of apartment buildings were constructed in the area and in doing its character changed in nature from industrial to residential.

== History ==
Up until World War II Gammarana hosted a small airport. During the war many small military aircraft used the airport to ferry supplies and war materials in and out of Teramo. One street, Via dell'aeroporto (Airport Road), still bears the name of this transportation link. The airport has long been razed to make way for the residential building boom which followed the Allied victories.

In the late 1950s and early 1960s several medium industrial enterprises were established in Gammarana. Included among these are Villeroy & Boch (a ceramics company which has since closed in the area and whose partially renovated factory is now a small concert hall), a candy factory (Confettificio Arcangeli, also closed and now a communications center for the Tercas S.p.A. newsgroup), and another candy manufacturer (Aquila d'Oro, whose factory was later transformed into Campo del re and today is the headquarters for the television show Teleponte). Previously located in the area was the recently demolished Adone factory (a small steel producer specializing in the manufacture of railroad tracks). This site awaits future development, so important for jobs and tax revenues to citizens of Teramo. In the year 2007 the old Gavini factory (a bottling company) is due to reopen as the Città della Scienza ("City of Science") educational and research center. In future years a physics and astrophysics museum named Galileium will be colocated in this building.

On the outskirts of this neighborhood are two public sports facilities. The area known as Acquaviva boasts several basketball courts, an open field used for soccer and rugby, a roller skating area, futsal, and indoor and outdoor swimming pools. A second area is called Camposcuola and is noted for its athletic field, tennis and five-a-side football courts.

In recent years local neighborhood authorities have encouraged local students in the nearby elementary, middle and high schools to construct large public murals on the brick enclosure which surrounds the long shuttered Villeroy & Boch factory as well as posterior wall of the railway station.

== See also ==
- Teramo
- Colleparco
- Cona
- Piano della Lenta
