= Colle Caruno =

Coordinates: 42°40′38.21″N 13°38′27.13″E

- Frazione
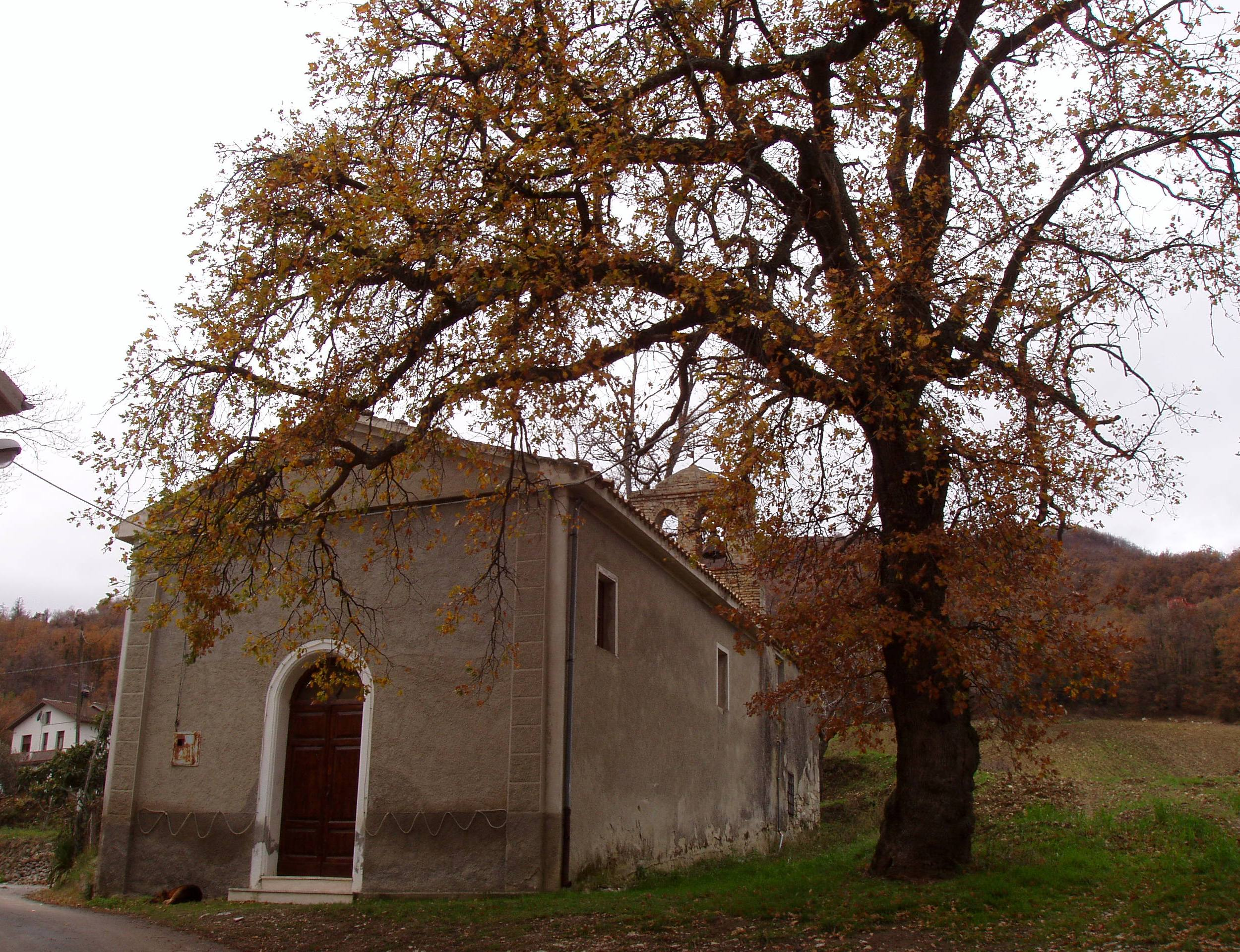
- Interactive map of Colle Caruno
- Country: Italy
- Region: Abruzzo
- Province: Teramo
- Commune: Teramo
- Time zone: UTC+1 (CET)
  - Summer (DST): UTC+2 (CEST)

Colle Caruno is a frazione (outlying area) of the Commune of Teramo in the Abruzzo Region of Italy. It is located about four miles from the communal capital.

== See also ==
- Teramo
- Colle Caruno - Sito Ufficiale
