= Scapriano =

Human settlement in Abruzzo, Italy

Coordinates: 42°40′20″N 13°41′09″E

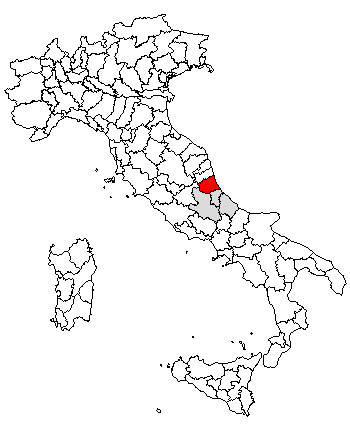
Location of Teramo in Italy

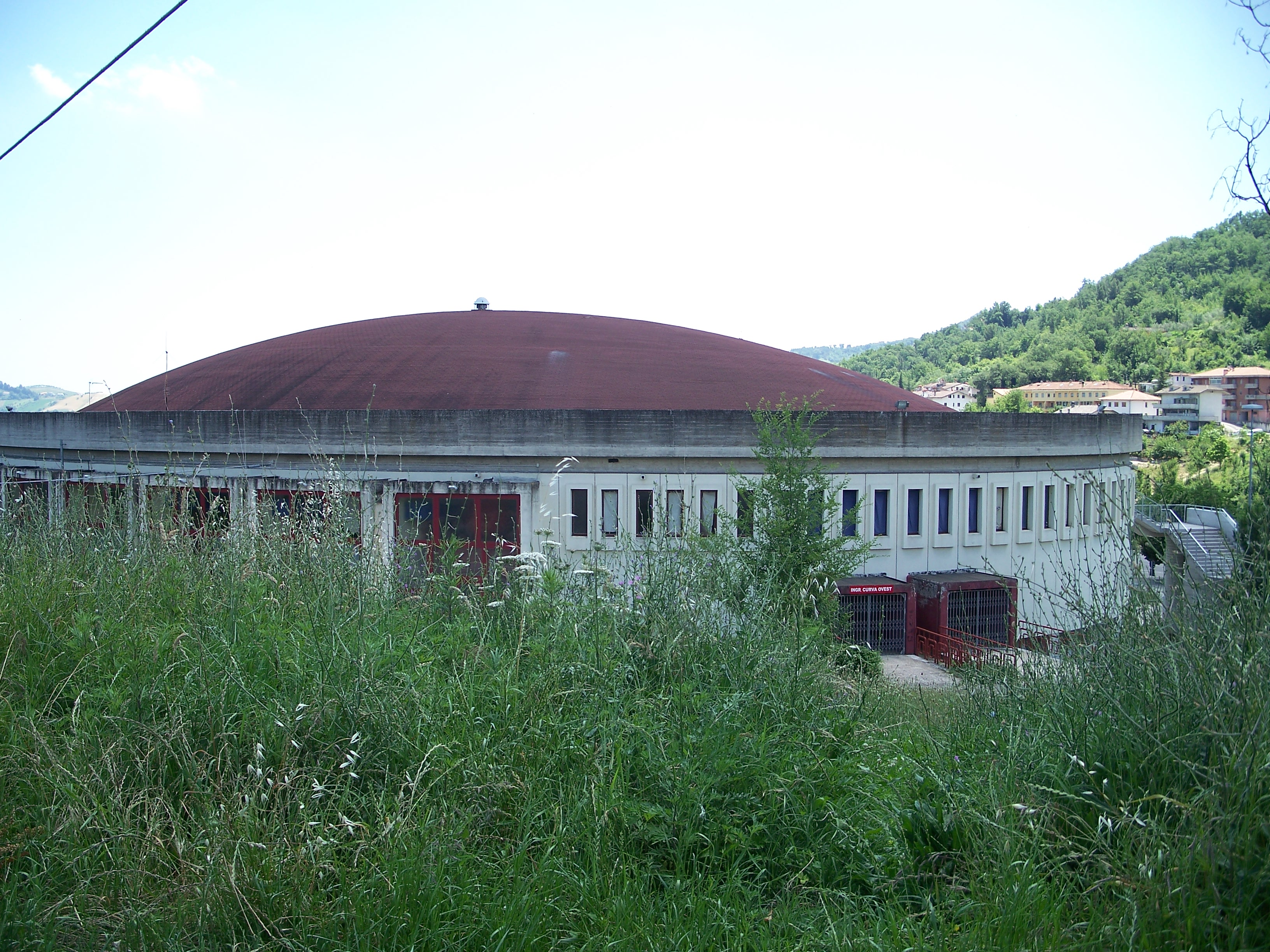

Scapriano is a small village in the province of Teramo, in the Abruzzo region of central Italy. It is a frazione of the town of Teramo.

== Geography ==
Scapriano lies in a hilly area about 2 km from Teramo, the provincial capital. Just below the village the stream Fosso Grande feeds into the Vezzola river. Crossing this river is as stone bridge which the locals refer to as the "Ponte del lu stucc". The name probably derives from a set of registered documents under the heading "Stucchi" which dealt with small herds of local prized sheep that stayed in Abruzzo over the winter instead of heading south to Puglia as part of the great transumanza. The town is located on one of the paths that the shepherds used in their local sheep herd migrations.

== History ==
One medieval administrative document dated 926 mentions Manfredi, Count of "Aprutium" (present day Abruzzo as donating several pieces of real estate in and around Scapriano to a local church by the name of Santa Maria.

Scapriano is home to the small ancient Church of Saint Martin, recently restored with the assistance of the local townsfolk. Another historical church is that of Saint Silvester and still another church, Saint John was once located here.

== Culture and sport ==
Located in Scapriano is the Teramo Palazzetto dello Sport (Teramo Sports Arena) where the local Serie B basketball team, Siviglia Wear schedules its home games.

== Notes and references ==
- Il Cartulario della Chiesa teramana. Codice Latino in pergamena del sec. XII dell'Archivio vescovile di Teramo, a cura di Francesco Savini, Roma, Forzani, 1910.
- Niccola Palma, Storia ecclesiastica e civile della regione più settentrionale del regno di Napoli. Detta dagli antichi Prætutium, ne' bassi tempi Aprutium oggi città di Teramo e Diocesi Aprutina, 5 voll., Teramo, presso U. Angeletti, 1832-1836; II edizione a cura di Vittorio Savorini e altri, 5 voll., Teramo, Tip. Giovanni Fabbri, 1890-1893; III edizione, 5 voll. Teramo, Cassa di Risparmio della Provincia di Teramo, 1978.
