= Monticelli, Teramo =

Coordinates: 42°42′06″N 13°43′57″E

View of Monticelli.

Montricelli church.

Monticelli is a small village, a frazione of the comune of Teramo in the Abruzzo region of Italy. It has previously been called Monticulo and Monticello.

== History ==
The origins of Monticelli date back to at least the 10th century. In 1062 Carbone di Solfio gave his holdings in the castle at Monticello, a small local church, and land in an area called Tricagli, to Pietro, bishop of Teramo. A castle in the Monticelli area is also mentioned in 13th century documents. Between the 12th and the 16th centuries a convent was present as well as churches dedicated to Saint Paul and Saint George. These are no longer in existence and their exact location is unknown.

On 30 April 1351, Queen Joanna I of Naples and her husband Louis of Taranto had Monticello, along with the neighboring communities of Ponzano, Varano and Tofo Sant'Eleuterio, incorporated into territory (at that time referred to as a Università) of Teramo. In 1368 the nearby Campora was added to this list. Norman feudal records show Monticello and nearby Nepezzano under the tutelage of the Melatinos, a powerful family who dominated the area around Teramo, up until the 15th century.

A market was once held on Saturdays, the same day as the current Teramo market. In past times Monticelli probably served as a way station for vendors bringing their goods from the Vibrata Valley to sell in Teramo.

== Notes and references ==
- Cerino, Rita; Marco D’Alesio; Rosalba D’Alesio (2004). Il ricettario di Maccabeo. Storia e gastronomia dell’antico feudo di Maccabeo Melatino. Teramo: Associazione Monticelli.
