= Rocciano =

Coordinates: 42°37′38″N 13°39′55″E

- Frazione
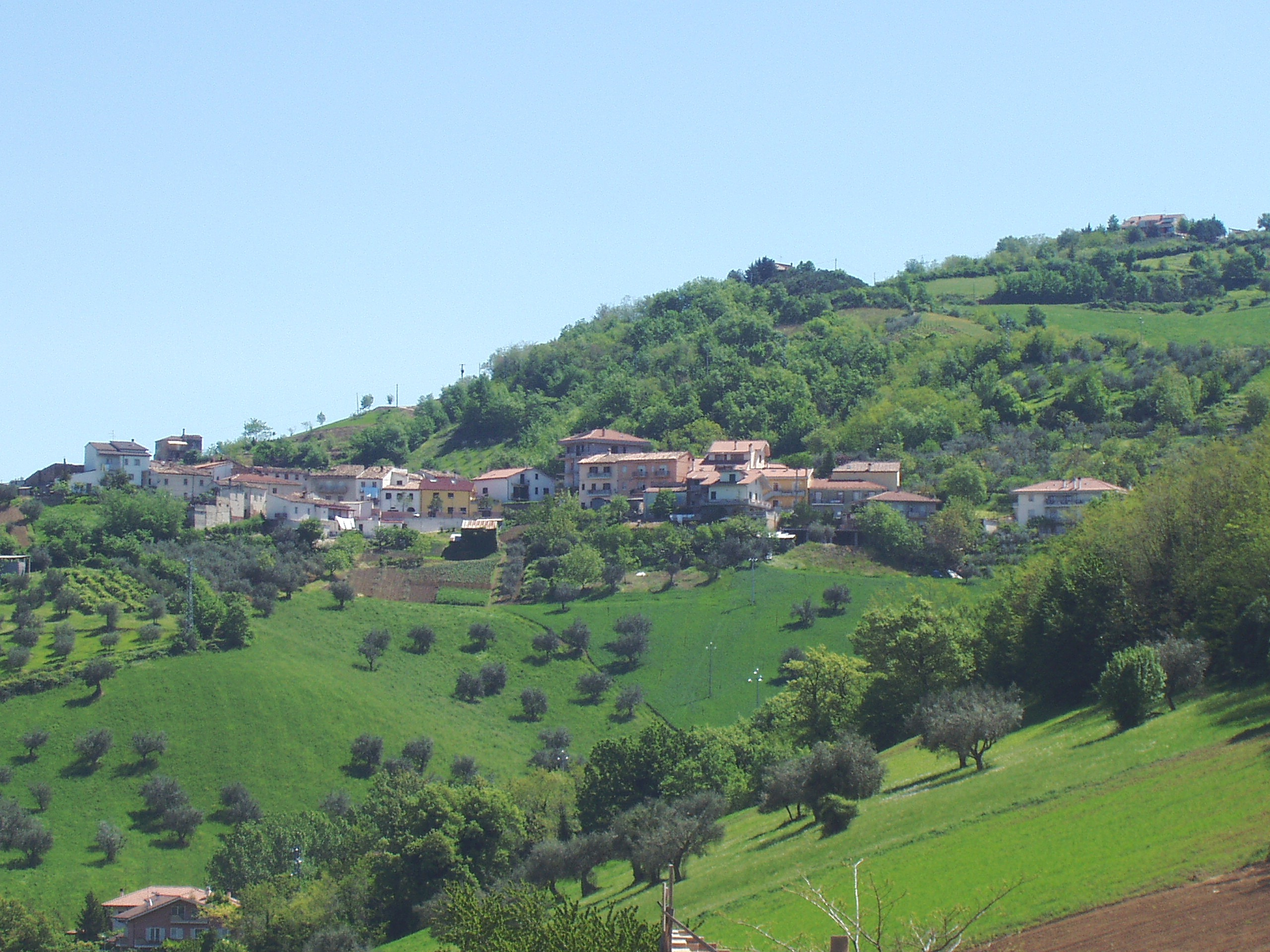
- Interactive map of Rocciano
- Country: Italy
- Region: Abruzzo
- Province: Teramo
- Commune: Teramo
- Time zone: UTC+1 (CET)
  - Summer (DST): UTC+2 (CEST)

Rocciano is a frazione in the Province of Teramo in the Abruzzo region of Italy.

== See also ==
- History of Abruzzo
