= Rapino, Teramo =

Coordinates: 42°36′21″N 13°41′35″E

Location in Italy

Rapino is a frazione of the commune of Teramo in the Abruzzo region of Italy.

== Geography ==
It sits at the top of an imposing hill about 8 miles from Teramo. To the west can be seen the Gran Sasso, the highest peak in the Apennines and to the east lies a plain leading to the Adriatic Sea.

== History ==
The town dates to pre-Roman Empire times and is rather important in that artifacts of the ancient Piceni and Etruscan tribes have been unearthed in this location. These pieces date back to the 4th century BC and are now on display at the Archaeological Museum of Chieti.

Rapino has an elongated shape with one road, winding through the village center and eventually leading to Teramo. A lesser road connects the village to the nearby state road (SS 150). The lack of an efficient means of reaching the SS 150 has served to greatly increase the village's isolation over the years. The local townspeople have recently increased the pressure on the provincial authorities to upgrade this important byway.

Santo Stefano is the main church of the village and was constructed in medieval times. It is best known for a crucifix dating back to the 16th century. Also present is a wooden belltower built in an architectural style reminiscent of the Italian Renaissance. In records dating back to the 11th century mention is made of a castle existing in this area.

On 23–24 May 1998 a large reunion was held in Rapino by provincial authorities to celebrate the inauguration of a statue honoring local individuals fallen in all of the wars in which Italy has participated.

On 9 October 2007 a town meeting was held at the old schoolhouse of Rapino. A town committee was organized and has since received official recognition by the communal authorities. Initial goals focus on petitioning the commune of Teramo to upgrade the town's transportation links and recreational facilities. Secondary goals include establishing a website for the village, obtaining funds for restoration work on the Chiesa di San Stefano, establishing a high speed ADSL internet connection, and improving the village's sanitary services.

== Economy ==
Up until the middle of the 20th century, the two most important economic activities in the area included farming and animal grazing.
