= Piano della Lenta =

Piano della Lenta is a neighborhood of Teramo, Italy. Piano della Lenta extends to the north of the city center along the State Highway 80 (SS 80), the main road to Ascoli Piceno. It is located about three kilometers from the Teramo city center and has the characteristic of being a mere extension of the city itself. It is located roughly a kilometre away, however from the town of Puntignano.

== Overview ==
The area's name, "Piano della Lenta" (Plain of Leisure) probably derives from a number of inns and wineries which once dotted the landscape. They served as a welcome stopping off point for travelers who journeyed from the Teramo city center to the surrounding villages and towns.

Piano della Lenta boasts a number of interesting attractions including five man (calcetto) and eleven man (calcio) soccer fields, two bocce ball sporting areas, a small amphitheater, a remote control miniature car raceway, and four public garden parks. A good portion of this development took place in the 1970s and 1980s, today making the area one of the most tranquil and convenient locations in the city of Teramo. The neighborhood is almost entirely residential and has a population of more than 3000 residents. Piano della Lenta hosts a highly ranked soccer club with a very strong youth division.

The local parish church, completed in 1933 is dedicated to Saint Rita. It is located in Piazza Gemma Marconi reachable by means of Via Ignazio Silone, the main street crossing through this area. Another important street, Via Insorti Bosco Marterse, passes nearby.

Although Piano della Lenta has been only recently developed, this specific location is noted in several historical documents:

- In 926 AD the land making up Piano della Lenta was deeded by Count Manfredi to the Bishop of Teramo.
- The area is mentioned both in a 1056 Papal Decree by Pope Victor II.
- Historian Niccola Palma wrote of a local castle going by the name of "De Le Vetiche." It served both as a quotidian mercantile trading center as well as a place of refuge during times of war. No traces exist today although ruins of the castle were still being unearthed as late as the early 19th century.
- A stone epigraph depicting a masculine torso with Roman inscriptions was recovered in the area. This was likely part of the castle at one time and has since been moved to the Archaeological Museum in nearby Chieti.

== See also ==
- Teramo
- Colleparco
- Cona
- Gammarana
