= Nepezzano =

Coordinates: 42°41′N 13°45′E

- frazione
- Interactive map of Nepezzano
- Country: Italy
- Region: Abruzzo
- Province: Teramo
- Commune: Teramo
- Postal code: 64100

Nepezzano is a suburb (frazione) of the provincial capital Teramo, Italy. It is located about 4 miles away from the town center.

The first written documentation regarding Nepezzano dates back to the 12th century in a listing of feudal properties (Rassegna dei Feudatar) found in the county of Teramo (then known as "Aprutina"). These documents show that one Maccabeo Melatino and his relatives had made claim to Nepezzano, along with the neighboring localities Monticello and Campora.

According to the historian Niccola Palma, the feudal castle of the Melatino family towered above a hill then known as Mount Marino. The castle was positioned in such a manner so as to provide an unobstructed view of the small village below and of the Melatino holdings. Through the beginning of the 19th century, traces of the castle ruins were still to be found alongside the district road coursing through this location. Professor Palma writes that a stone tablet found nearby carried the Latin inscription "Iter. Privat Fundi Nepotiani." At one time this was probably placed at one of the entry points to a location carrying the name Nepotiano. Thus, the derivation of the name of the town currently known as Nepazzano. The word "Nepotiano" noted on this boundary stone perhaps refers to a Roman colony linked to the larger city of "Pretut" (the ancient name for the town today known as Teramo).

With regard to its ecclesiastical heritage, in 1188 Pope Clement III issued a Papal Bull placing Nepezzano, along with the San Martino church and associated land holdings, under the tutelage of the town of San Nicolò a Tordino. This remained in effect until San Nicolò a Tordino itself could no longer claim to be unclaimed by any sovereign entity.

In 1351 Nepezzano was united with the Comune di Teramo and remains to this day a suburb of this city.

Towards the end of the 16th century, several colonies in the Abruzzo region were founded by groups of Venetian warriors and exiles known as "Schiavoni" and more specifically arriving from the Dalmatian coastal region of the Adriatic Sea. One such settlement was found in Cologna, today a suburb of the town of Roseto degli Abruzzi. Another small group of country houses, constructed of earth covered straw, was found near Nepezzano in an area today known as Villa Schiavoni. A group of Schiavoni went to live in Teramo proper where a free standing village arose. In memory of their ancestors, thedescendants of the Schiavoni constructed a chapel in the Cathedral of Teramo and dedicated it to Saint Nicholas of Bari. On 23 June 1809 Nepezzano, along with the neighboring town of Ripattone, suffered greatly when they were captured by Italian brigand troops fighting against the Napoleonic occupation.

The church in Nepezzano was restored in 1931 by the parish priest, Domenico Pirocchi, who installed a new bell tower. The street leading up to the church was completed in 1927.

For many centuries, the Di Domenicatonio family retained vast holdings of land near Teramo in the suburbs of Nepezzano, Villa Schiavoni, and Coste Sant’Agostino.

In the early 1900s, one infamous native of this town, Marco Reginelli emigrated to Penns Grove and later Camden, New Jersey where he was involved in underworld matters.
