= Villa Taraschi =

Coordinates: 42°39′31″N 13°42′9″E

- Frazione
- Interactive map of Villa Taraschi
- Country: Italy
- Region: Abruzzo
- Province: Teramo
- Commune: Teramo
- Time zone: UTC+1 (CET)
  - Summer (DST): UTC+2 (CEST)

Villa Taraschi is a frazione located approximately 2.30 km from the centre of Teramo in the Province of Teramo, Abruzzo region, Italy.
