= Caprafico, Teramo =

Caprafico
- Frazione
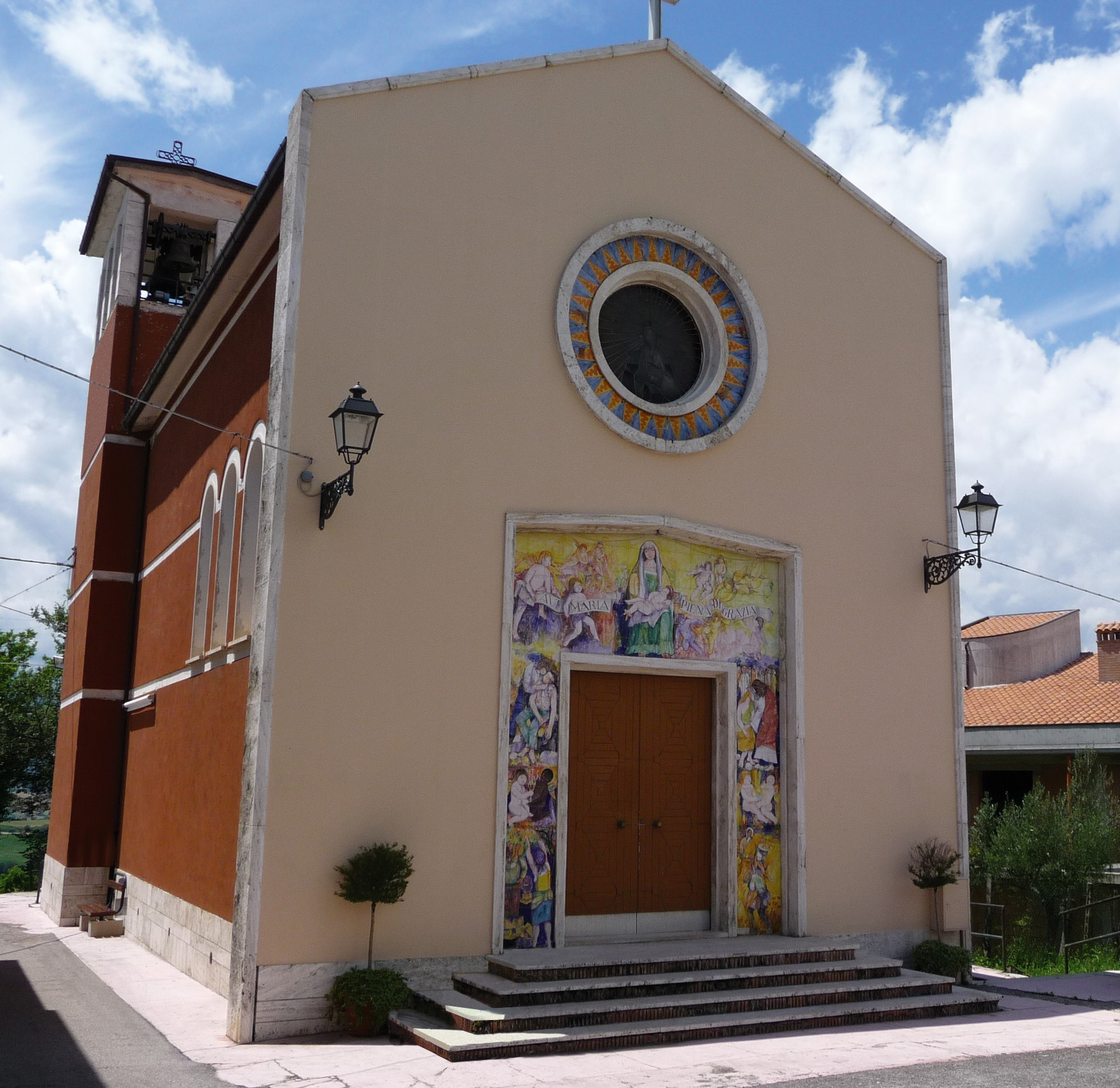
- Facciata esterna della chiesa di Santa Colomba e Sant'Emidio, situata a Caprafico, frazione di Teramo
- Interactive map of Caprafico
- Coordinates: 42°37′N 13°46′E
- Country: Italy
- Region: Abruzzo
- Province: Teramo
- Commune: Teramo
- Time zone: UTC+1 (CET)
  - Summer (DST): UTC+2 (CEST)

Caprafico is a frazione of Teramo, Province of Teramo, in the Abruzzo region of Italy.
