= Santa Reparata, Civitella del Tronto =

Coordinates: 42°48′31″N 13°41′53″E

Santa Reparata (Civitella del Tronto)
- Frazione
- Interactive map of Santa Reparata (Civitella del Tronto)
- Country: Italy
- Region: Abruzzo
- Province: Teramo
- Time zone: UTC+1 (CET)
  - Summer (DST): UTC+2 (CEST)

Santa Reparata (Civitella del Tronto) is a frazione in the Province of Teramo in the Abruzzo region of Italy.
