= Valle Pezzata =

Coordinates: 42°42′48″N 13°31′35″E

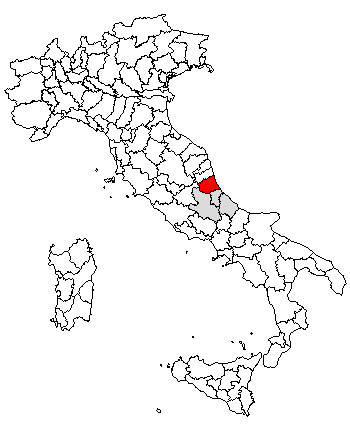
Location of the province of Teramo

Valle Pezzata is a village in the Abruzzo region of central Italy. It is a frazione of the comune of Valle Castellana. The village lies in an area known as Monti della Laga, deep within the Gran Sasso e Monti della Laga National Park.

== Geography ==
The second part of the town name "Pezzata" may well have come from the fact that this village is physically split into several distinct localities or pieces (It: pezze). The two main portions of Valle Pezzata go by the names Valle Pezzata da Sole and Valle Pezzata da Borea. Others in contrast, such as the historian Niccola Palma, claim that the village's name comes from the ancient Italian word "pozzata" which refers to an area delimited by irrigation ditches.

== History ==
According to the historian Luigi Ercole, in 1804 Vallepezzata had a population of 158. By 1841 this number had dropped to 102 inhabitants. Currently the village lies completely abandoned.

== The Church ==
From at least the Middle Ages onward, Valle Pezzata, along with the surrounding villages of the upper Castellana Valley, have fallen within the administrative jurisdiction of the Roman Catholic Diocese of Ascoli Piceno.

There is only one remaining local church, it being dedicated to Saint Nicholas of Bari. It is part of the Saint Annunziata of Valle Castellana parish. The church is rectangular in shape and very small. Due to safety concerns, the apse was recently demolished. Under the architraves of the doors are carved heads of owls made into bracket supports. On each side are reliefs in the form of lions in the act of climbing. An inscription bears the date 1519. The inner sanctum of the church is rather plain and devoid of great artistic significance. The small altar is made of travertine stone. The visitor will note a statue of Saint Vincent, the work of a craftsman from the village Val Gardena and dating back to 1954. The church bell, 37,5 x 41 centimeters in dimension carries the late Gothic inscription: AVE M LM CISTER 0 A R L V D T M 0 MCCCCQIIII. This would date the building to the year 1444. The church bell was likely salvaged from the bell tower which once made up a portion of a Franciscan Convent.

== Customs and Traditions ==
In times past, the ground would freeze solid during the cold winter months, thus making it extremely difficult to dig a grave in which to bury the dead. The local customs of the day dictated that the cadavers would be strapped to the roofs of the houses where they would remain relatively well preserved and safe from the ravages of wild animals. Formal burial services would take place during the first spring thaws.

== Notes and references ==
- Luigi Ercole, Dizionario topografico alfabetico della provincia di Teramo, Berardo Carlucci e Compagni, Teramo, 1804, p. 95; e in ristampa dell'editore Arnaldo Forni, Bologna, 1984;
- Paesi abbandonati: contributo al recupero del patrimonio edilizio dei Monti della Laga, a cura di Giovanni Di Marco, Lucio Di Blasio, Sabatino Fratini, Associazione Gandhi, EGI, Teramo, Edigrafital, 1991;
