= Teramo =

City and comune in Abruzzo, Italy

Teramo Tèreme (Neapolitan)
- Comune
- Città di Teramo
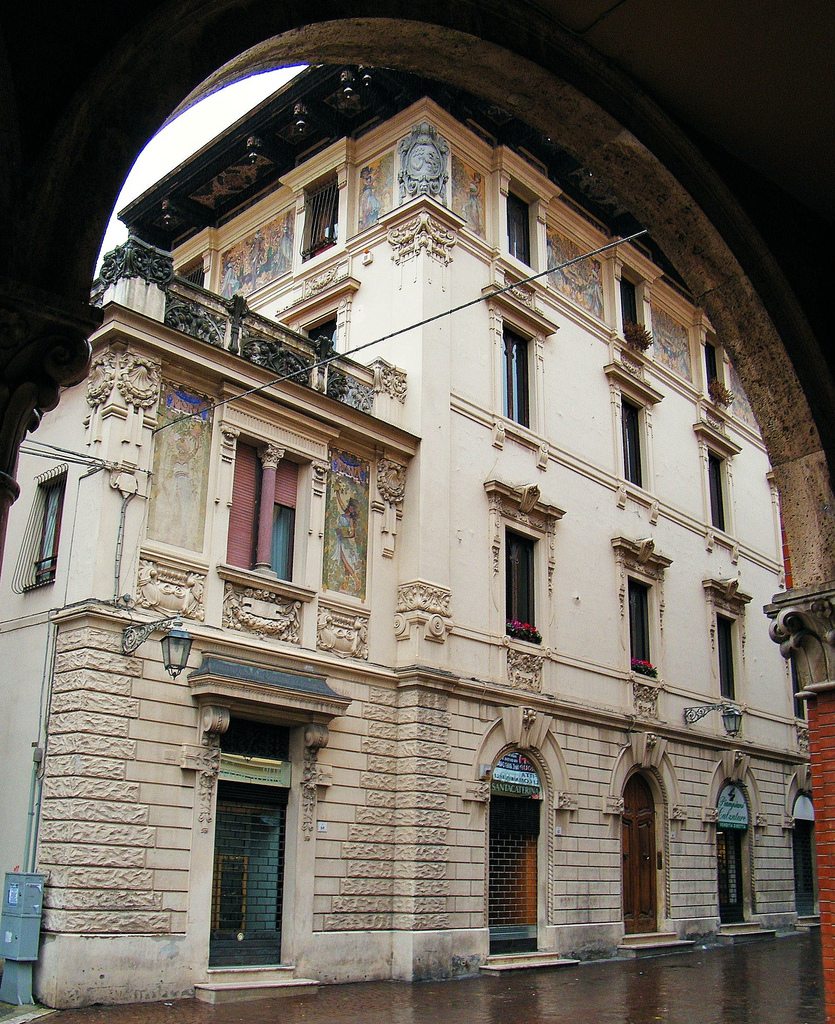
- Palazzo Castelli.

- Flag Coat of arms

- Location within Italy Location within Abruzzo
- Coordinates: 42.659109°N 13.702167°E
- Country: Italy
- Region: Abruzzo
- Province: Teramo (TE)
- Frazioni: See list

Government
  - Mayor: Gianguido D'Alberto (Ind.)

Area
  - Total: 152.84 km^{2} (59.01 sq mi)
- Elevation: 265 m (869 ft)

Population (January 1, 2023)
  - Total: 51,548
  - Density: 337.27/km^{2} (873.52/sq mi)
- Demonym: Teramani
- Time zone: UTC+1 (CET)
  - Summer (DST): UTC+2 (CEST)
- Postal code: 64100
- Patron saint: Saint Berardo
- Saint day: December 19
- Website: Official website

Teramo (Italian pronunciation: [ˈtɛːramo]; Abruzzese: Tèreme [ˈtɛːrəmə]) is a city and comune in the Italian region of Abruzzo, the capital of the province of Teramo.

The city, 150 kilometres (93 miles) from Rome, is situated between the highest mountains of the Apennines (Gran Sasso d'Italia) and the Adriatic coast. The town is located by the confluence of the Vezzola and Tordino rivers, on a hillside area where the terrain features along with the Mediterranean climate make the territory rich in vineyards and olive groves.

The economy of the town is mostly based on activities connected with agriculture and commerce, as well as a sound industrial sector: textiles, foods, engineering, building materials and ceramics. Teramo can be reached from the A14 and the A24 motorways.

== Climate ==
The climate in the region is described as fresh-temperate. During the coolest month, which is January, temperatures average around 5.5 °C (41.9 °F). On the other hand, during the warmest month, July, temperatures average around 24 °C (75 °F). In winter, the region experiences significant snowfall, as observed in 2005. Precipitation is not frequent and is mainly concentrated in late spring. Summers in the area are characterised by days of relatively high temperatures.

Climate data for Teramo, elevation 300 m (980 ft), (1991–2014)
Month	Jan	Feb	Mar	Apr	May	Jun	Jul	Aug	Sep	Oct	Nov	Dec	Year
Record high °C (°F)	22.2 (72.0)	22.2 (72.0)	26.4 (79.5)	28.4 (83.1)	34.5 (94.1)	38.8 (101.8)	40.2 (104.4)	40.5 (104.9)	38.2 (100.8)	31.0 (87.8)	25.7 (78.3)	24.5 (76.1)	40.5 (104.9)
Mean daily maximum °C (°F)	10.8 (51.4)	11.4 (52.5)	14.9 (58.8)	18.1 (64.6)	22.9 (73.2)	27.1 (80.8)	29.7 (85.5)	30.2 (86.4)	25.3 (77.5)	20.8 (69.4)	15.6 (60.1)	11.7 (53.1)	19.9 (67.8)
Daily mean °C (°F)	6.8 (44.2)	7.1 (44.8)	10.1 (50.2)	13.1 (55.6)	17.7 (63.9)	21.2 (70.2)	23.7 (74.7)	24.2 (75.6)	19.9 (67.8)	16.1 (61.0)	11.4 (52.5)	7.7 (45.9)	14.9 (58.9)
Mean daily minimum °C (°F)	2.7 (36.9)	2.7 (36.9)	5.4 (41.7)	8.2 (46.8)	12.4 (54.3)	15.3 (59.5)	17.7 (63.9)	18.1 (64.6)	14.5 (58.1)	11.4 (52.5)	7.2 (45.0)	3.7 (38.7)	9.9 (49.9)
Record low °C (°F)	−10.1 (13.8)	−11.9 (10.6)	−7.1 (19.2)	−2.8 (27.0)	−0.2 (31.6)	5.8 (42.4)	9.2 (48.6)	8.2 (46.8)	5.2 (41.4)	0.9 (33.6)	−5.4 (22.3)	−7.0 (19.4)	−11.9 (10.6)
Average precipitation mm (inches)	59.7 (2.35)	52.5 (2.07)	66.5 (2.62)	73.9 (2.91)	61.1 (2.41)	60.3 (2.37)	50.0 (1.97)	53.2 (2.09)	64.2 (2.53)	77.3 (3.04)	83.9 (3.30)	77.3 (3.04)	779.9 (30.7)
Average precipitation days	6.6	6.6	7.7	8.0	7.6	6.8	5.4	5.4	6.1	7.2	8.3	8.7	84.4
Source 1: Climi e viaggi
Source 2: Regione Abruzzo (preciptiation 1951–2000)

== Name ==
Interamna (Greek: Ἰντέραμνα: Eth. Interamnas, Interamnātis) was the name of several cities in different parts of Italy. Its etymology, already pointed out by Varro and Festus, indicates their position at the confluence of two streams. The form "Interamnium" (Greek: Ἰντεράμνιον), and the ethnic form Interamnis are also found, but more rarely. The name referred to the two rivers Vezzola and Tordino, between which it lies.

The name is already defined in extant manuscripts of the Liber Coloniarum into Teramne, whence its modern form of Teramo. But in the Middle Ages it appears to have been known also by the name of Aprutium, supposed to be a corruption of Praetutium, or rather of the name of the people Praetutii, applied (as was so often the case in Gaul) to their chief city. Thus the name Abrutium is present among the cities of Picenum enumerated by the Geographer of Ravenna (iv. 31); and under the Lombards a comes Aprutii is mentioned. The name has been retained in that of Abruzzo, now a region of Italy.

== History ==
=== Pre Roman Age ===
A settlement of the 1st millennium BC and some buildings of ancient Italic tribes were the object of archaeological excavations. The most ancient historical remains were found in the outskirts of the city, precisely in the neighborhood Madonna delle grazie, where, among many, a burial place with a dagger and a halberd were found. Allegedly, the development of the old settlement was due to the commercial center founded by the Etruscan civilization.

According to the Roman author Sextus Julius Frontinus, the ancient Perut or Pretut (meaning "Hill surrounded by waters") strongly developed in dimensions and importance until it became the capital of the Praetutii tribe.

=== Roman age ===
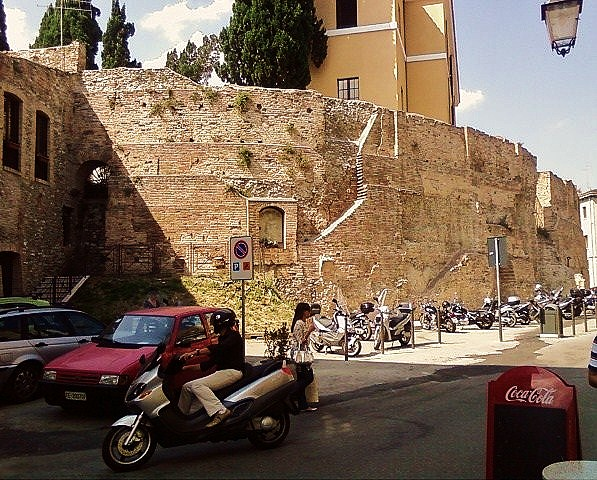
Roman Amphitheatre

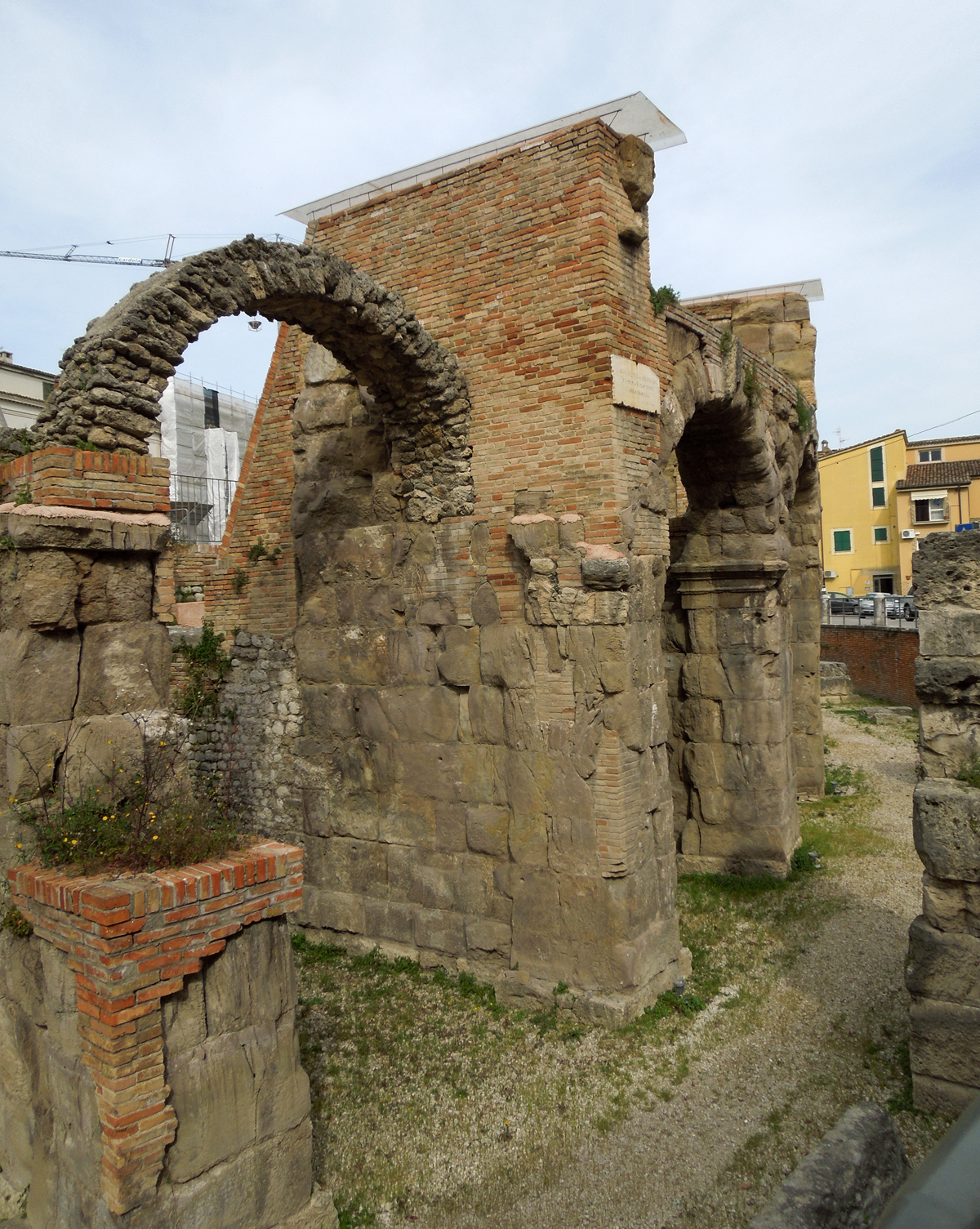
Roman theatre

In the battle of Sentinum (295 BC), the Romans defied the Italian confederation (Sabellians, Etrusci, Umbri and their allies the Gauls), starting the Samnite Wars. In 290 BC, the Sabine area, along with the Praetutii's region was occupied by the legions sent by the consul Manius Curius Dentatus. The city took the Latin name of Interamnia Praetuttiorum or Interamnia Praetutia ("City of the Praetutii between two rivers"). During the reign of Augustus Interamnia is included in the Picenum district. The area of the current province was divided from south to north into the Ager Hatrianus, Ager Praetutianus and Ager Palmense.

After the Second Social War, Interamnia became a municipium. The city lost the status of Municipium because of the participation of Lucius Cornelius Sulla in the Social war (91–88 BC), but the city will subsequently regain it for expressed will of Julius Caesar.

During the Roman age, thanks to its nearness to the capital of the empire, the city lived a prosperous and favorable moment as proven by the numerous mosaics, theater, thermal baths and the amphitheater remains. As historians like Ptolemy, Livy and Pliny remember, the city reached its best period under the emperor Hadrian, with the constructions of the temples dedicated to Mars and Apollo.

=== Middle Ages ===
Little is known about Teramo in the early Middle Ages, after first destruction of the city in the year 410 by the Visigoths under Alaric I. The Ostrogoths ruled Interamnia 552–554 AD. Right after the Gothic War (6th century), the city became a Byzantine possession. Teramo was included in the Marchia Firmana, part of the Exarchate of Ravenna. Later it was a Lombard fief and part of the Duchy of Spoleto.

In 1129, the city was conquered by the Normans, as part of the County of Apulia. In 1140, it became a possession of Roger II of Sicily, the first King of Sicily. During the strife following Roger's coronation, Teramo was destroyed by a Norman force under Robert II of Loritello. Only the tower of Piazza Sant'Anna was saved from this sack; from this moment on it will be called Torre Bruciata (burnt tower). In 1268, the domination of the House of Hohenstaufen, who had inherited Sicily from Roger II's line, ended; they were replaced by the House of Anjou.

The ecclesiastical authority of the Aprutina Diocese, led by the bishops Rainaldo Acquaviva, Niccolò degli Arcioni (1317), Stefano da Teramo (1335) and Pietro di Valle (1366) boosted the city's economy, as witnessed by the construction of castles, churches, cloisters and palaces along with the great privileges granted by the sovereigns. Within the following two centuries Teramo became part of the Kingdom of Naples.

=== Renaissance and modern era ===
The 15th century saw the struggles between the most important families of the city (De Valle and Melatino). The exemplary hanging of 13 followers of Melatino's family is still remembered in a stone shield in the very center of the city. The monument represents two heads with their tongues out under the writing "A lo parlare agi mesura" (mind what you say).

During the first years of the century, the tyrant Antonello de Valle was assassinated; his castle, located in what is now Garibaldi Square, was demolished. The legend says that the belligerence between the families ended thanks to the women of the city who proclaimed a strike of affection. Despite the internal struggles, the city lived a very developed cultural period in the century. Artists like Jacobello del Fiore and Nicola da Guardiagrele were called to work in the city, which had commercial relationship with Tuscany and Venice.

After the death of Ferdinand II, Charles II of Spain sold Teramo to the Duke of Atri for 40,000 ducats. The people of Teramo rebelled, but with no result. In 1626 Teramo was struck by an earthquake, followed four years later by the plague. From 1707, after of the War of the Spanish Succession, the Habsburg monarchy rules the whole Kingdom of the Two Sicilies for 27 years. During the Age of Enlightenment Teramo is an active centre of intellectual life, especially with Melchiorre Delfico, a notable poet, composer and Italian philosopher. In 1798 French troops entered Teramo, and though they were initially repulsed by the citizens, they returned a few days later, sacking the whole city.

In 1806, Napoleon defeated the troops of Ferdinand I of the Two Sicilies, and Teramo became a French possession until 1815, when it reverted to the Kingdom of Naples. King Ferdinand II of the Two Sicilies visited the city in 1832, 1844 and 1847. In 1890, the Observatory of Collurania was founded.

=== Contemporary age ===
In 1925, the first Italian Psychoanalytic Society was founded in Teramo.

During World War II, on 25 June 1943, German troops arrived in Teramo and proceeded to Bosco Martese where they fought against the men of the Resistance movement. The episode is remembered as the "Battle of Bosco Martese".

In 1972, the first edition of Interamnia World Cup was held.

The University of Teramo was founded in the city in 1993.

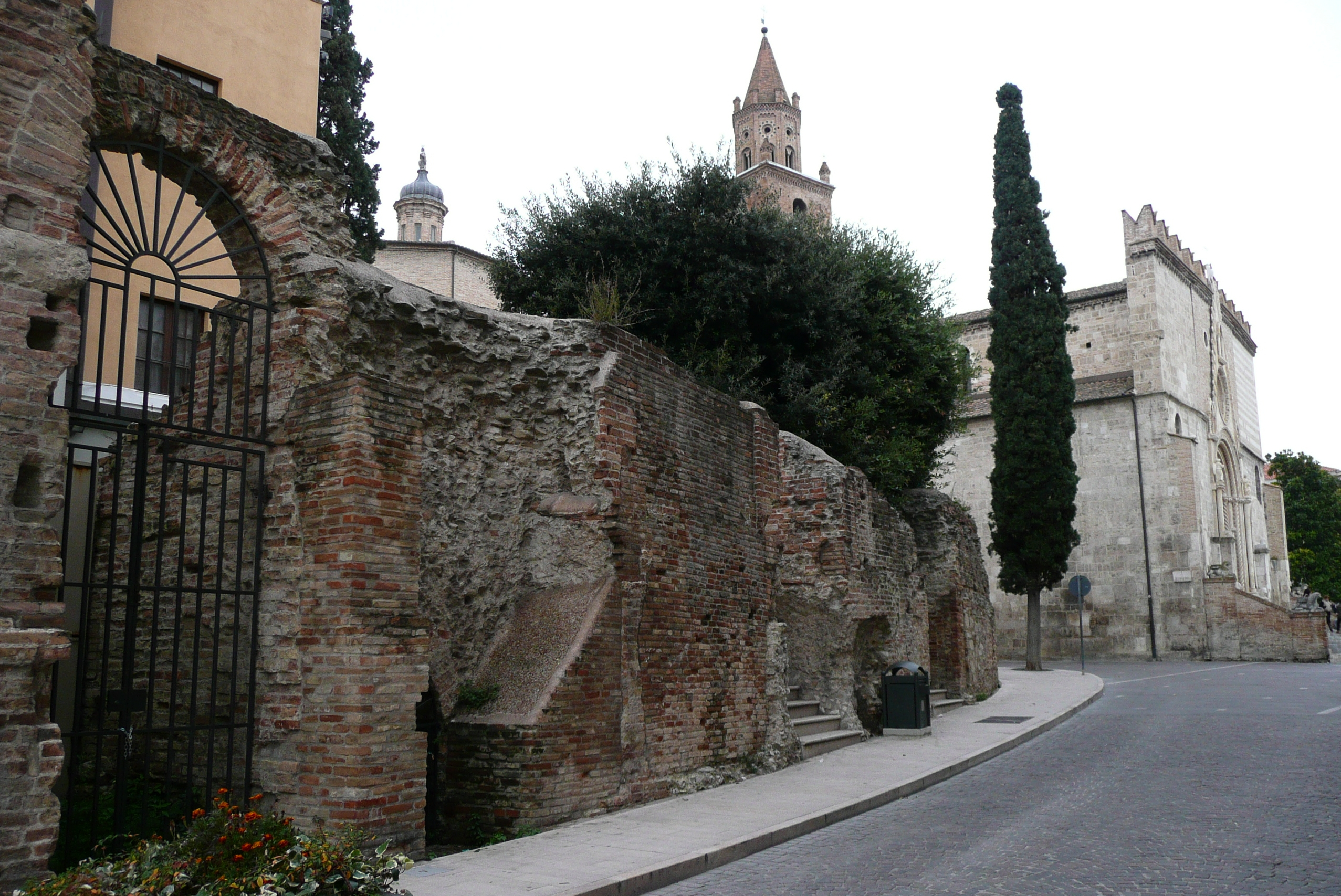
Remains of the amphitheatre, with the cathedral in the background.

== Main sights ==
The city's main attractions include:

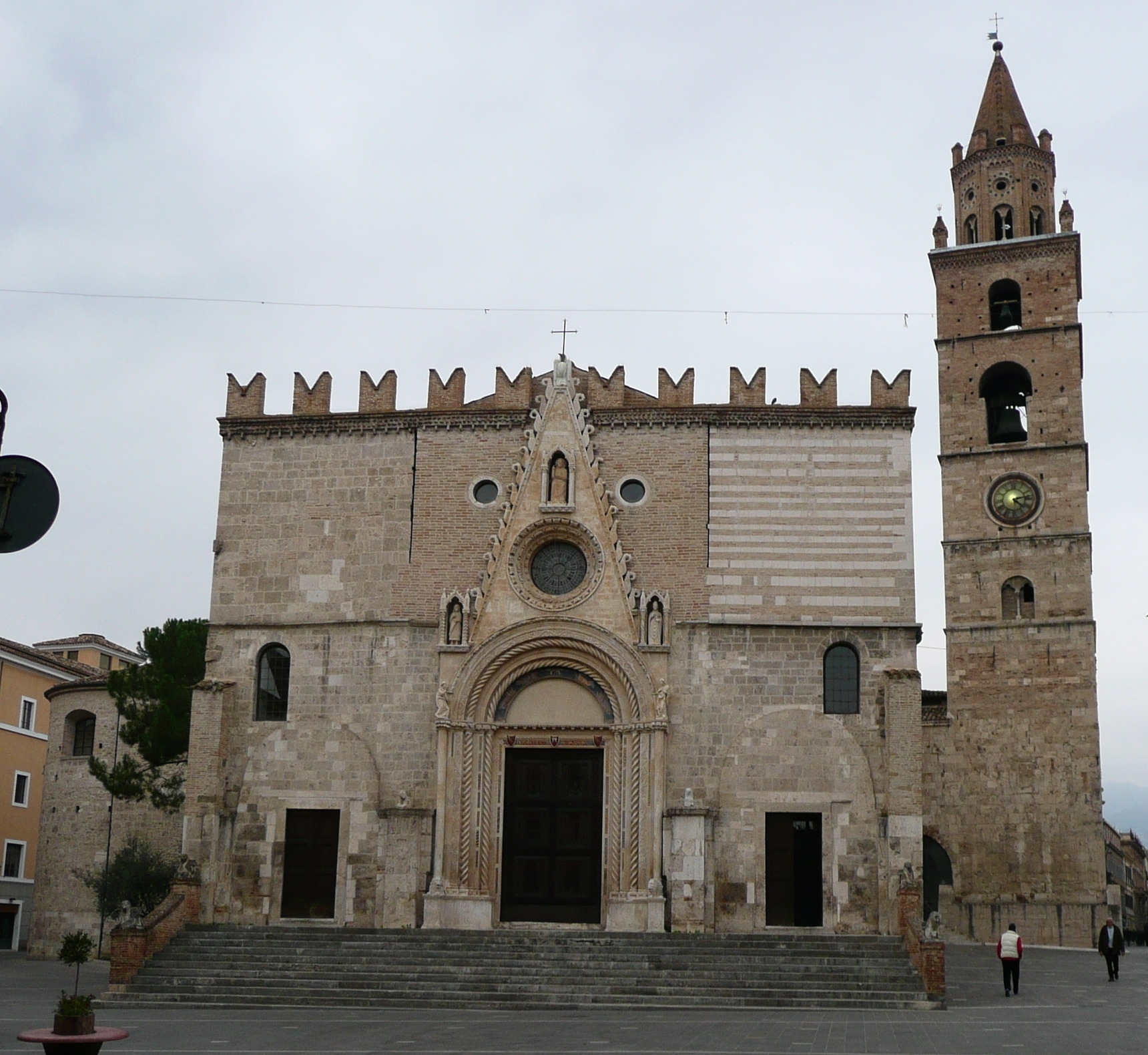
Teramo Cathedral.

- the Cathedral of Saint Berardo, built in 1158 by bishop Guido II, in Romanesque style. It has a portal in Gothic style, finished in 1332 by the Roman master Deodato di Cosma. It houses a silver antependium by Nicola of Guardiagrele (with 35 scenes of the life of Jesus) and a polyptych by the Venetian artist Jacobello del Fiore depicting the Incoronation of the Virgin. Annexed is a 50-metre-tall (164-foot) bell tower.
- the Romanesque church of Sant'Antonio (1127), with a decorated portal. The interior, with a single nave, was renovated along Baroque lines.
- the church of San Getulio, built in the early Middle Ages on the ruins of a Roman temple, finally destroyed in 1155 by the Normans. Only the presbyterium and some Romanesque elements of the original building remain today.
- the church of San Domenico (14th century) with a fine Virgin with Child.
- the sanctuary of the Madonna delle Grazie (also known as Chiesa di Santa Maria delle Grazie). It has a Romanesque cloister and a 15th-century miraculous wooden statue of the Virgin, attributed to Silvestro dell'Aquila.
- the Palazzo Vescovile ("Bishops Palace"), from the 14th century.
- the remains of the Roman theatre (built about 30 BC) and of the amphitheatre (about 3rd–4th century AD). Under Palazzo Savini are remains of a Roman domus, including a 1st-century BC opus tessellatum pavement which depicts a fighting lion and other decorative elements.
- the Torre Bruciata ("Burnt Tower"), a Roman tower from the 2nd century BC, in opus quadratum. The name derives from the traces left by the siege in 1156 by Robert III of Loritello.
- Church of Santa Maria de Praediis (10th–11th centuries), built using materials from the destroyed castle and Roman villas and temples.

== Demographics ==
Historical population

Year	Pop.	±%
1861	19,961	—
1871	20,639	+3.4%
1881	20,844	+1.0%
1901	24,972	+19.8%
1911	26,174	+4.8%
1921	27,275	+4.2%
1931	31,790	+16.6%
1936	33,796	+6.3%

Year	Pop.	±%
1951	38,643	+14.3%
1961	41,899	+8.4%
1971	47,804	+14.1%
1981	51,092	+6.9%
1991	51,756	+1.3%
2001	51,023	−1.4%
2011	54,294	+6.4%
2021	51,849	−4.5%

Source: ISTAT

== Culture ==
An art exhibit, Maggio Festeggiante, is held each May. The summer calendar includes the Teramo Literary Prize and the Interamnia World Cup, an international handball event. A week in October is also dedicated to an international photography of film show.

=== University of Teramo ===
The University of Teramo offers five faculties, 24 bachelor's degree courses, 35 master's, six postgraduate schools and 10 departments. The Coste Sant'Agostino Campus holds the faculties of Law, Communication Sciences, and Political Science. The university is going through a period of internationalization by offering scholarships to students from all over of the world.

=== Osservatorio Collurania ===
The Observatory of Teramo was founded by Vincenzo Cerulli in 1890–1891, and donated to the Italian administration in 1891. Starting from 1994, the observatory owns an 80-centimetre-diameter (31.5 in) optical telescope.

== Government ==
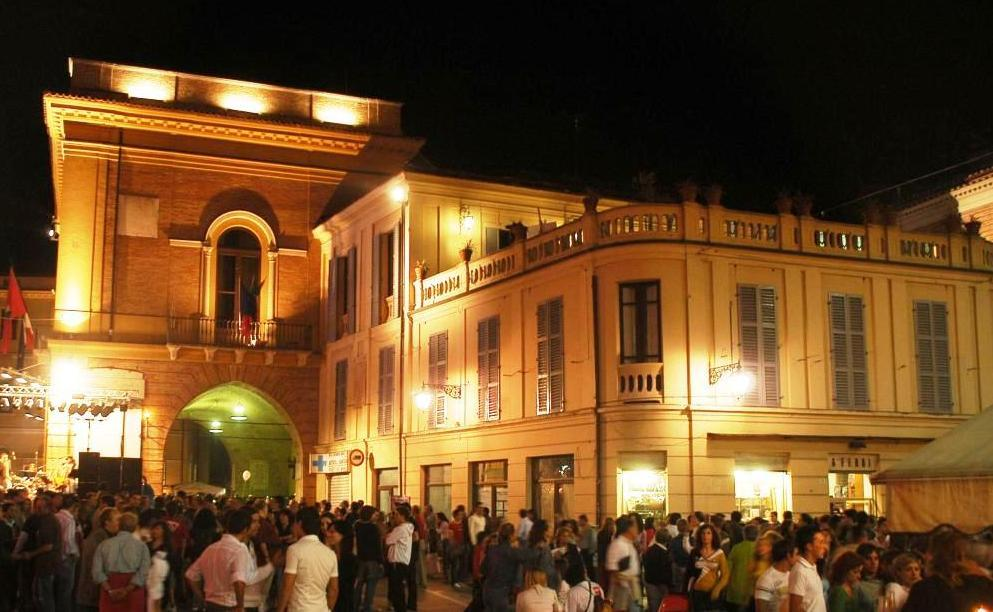
City Hall.

At the municipal level, the City of Teramo has a council made up of the mayor and councilmen that are elected every 5 years. in Italy every citizen over 18 has the right to vote.

== Twin towns – sister cities ==
Teramo is twinned with:

- Berane, Montenegro, since 1982
- Memmingen, Germany, since 1986
- Rishon LeZion, Israel, since 1988
- Prague 7, Czech Republic, since 2005
- Ribeirão Preto, Brazil, since 2005
- Gorzów Wielkopolski, Poland, since 2007
- Ávila, Spain, since 2010
- Strovolos, Cyprus, since 2010
- Aglandjia, Cyprus, since 2011

== Notable people ==
People born in or around Teramo include:

- Berardo da Pagliara (?-1123), bishop and patron saint of the city and diocese
- Melchiorre Delfico (1744–1835), Enlightenment philosopher
- Melchiorre Delfico (1825–1895), caricaturist
- Vincenzo Cerulli (1859–1927), astronomer
- Ivan Graziani (1945–1997), singer-songwriter
- Marco Pannella (1930–2016), politician
- Francesco Possenti (1838–1861), also known as Saint Gabriel of Our Lady of Sorrows. Patron saint of Abruzzo
- Felice Centofanti (1969–present), a former soccer player
- Marco Mordente (1979–present), Basketball player
- Gianni Di Venanzo (1920–1966), cinematographer
- Gaia Sabbatini (born 1999), Italian middle-distance runner

== Neighborhoods ==
- Il Castello
- Colleparco
- Gammarana
- Madonna della Cona
- San Berardo
- San Benedetto
- San Leonardo
- Santa Maria a Bitetto
- Santo Spirito
- Villa Mosca
- Villa Pavone
- Piano della Lenta
- Colleatterrato

== Frazioni ==
Frazioni within the commune of Teramo include:

- Cannelli
- Caprafico
- Castagneto
- Castrogno
- Cavuccio
- Cerreto
- Chiareto
- Colle Caruno
- Colleatterrato Alto
- Colleminuccio
- Colle Santa Maria
- Forcella
- Frondarola
- Galeotti
- Garrano
- Garrano Basso
- Magnanella
- Miano
- Monticelli
- Nepezzano
- Pantaneto
- Poggio Cono
- Piano D'Accio
- Piano della Lenta
- Poggio San Vittorino
- Ponzano
- Putignano
- Rapino
- Rocciano
- Rupo
- Sardinara
- Saccoccia
- San Nicolò a Tordino
- San Pietro ad Lacum
- Sant'Atto
- Santa Reparata
- Scapriano
- Sciusciano
- Sorrenti
- Spiano
- Tofo Sant'Eleuterio
- Tordinia
- Turri
- Valle Pezzata
- Valle San Giovanni
- Valle Soprana
- Varano
- Villa Falchini
- Villa Gesso
- Villa Ripa
- Villa Romita
- Villa Stanghieri
- Villa Taraschi
- Villa Viola
- Villa Vomano

== Sport ==
=== Basketball ===
Teramo Basket was a basketball team playing in Serie A, the Italian professional basketball league. They finished third in the league in 2009 which qualified them for the Eurocup in 2010. Italian and American players have appeared with the team, including Bobby Jones, Clay Tucker, Jaycee Carroll, Roger Powell, and Hassan Adams. They dissolved in 2012 due to financial issues.

=== Football ===
Teramo Calcio was founded on 15 July 1913.

The "Gaetano Bonolis" stadium hosts concerts and football matches. It has a capacity of 8,000.

=== Handball ===
HC Teramo 2002 team won the Italian top league in 2012 in handball. The club also has a counterpart men's team.

Every July, the city hosts the Interamnia World Cup, an international handball tournament with teams from all over the world.

=== Other sports ===
Other sports practiced in Teramo are: tennis (the city hosts an international tournament once a year), rugby, water polo and rallying with Rally of Teramo. The Maratonina pretuziana short marathon is celebrated every year.

Teramo torball is the team that has won the most titles in Italy; it has also won a Champion's league.

== Gastronomy ==
The provincial Teramo gastronomy is known for its variety and richness. Typical ingredients include agnello (lamb), peperoncino (hot pepper), formaggio pecorino (sheep milk cheeses), and slow roasted pork. Common wines are the renowned Montepulciano and Trebbiano d'Abruzzo.

Typical dishes from Teramo and the surrounding communities include the following:

- scrippelle – This dish is served in the throughout the Teramo province and is somewhat similar to French crêpes, although typically made without milk. There are two common variations. The first is scrippelle 'mbusse – (dialect for scrippelle in brodo or broth) and consists of scrippelle rolled up in Pecorino or Parmesan cheese and served in chicken broth. A second variation is timballo – scrippelle layered with ragù, meat or tiny meatballs (polpettini), various cheeses such as scamorza, and sometimes peas (piselli).
- maccheroni alla chitarra – a flat, stringlike egg pasta which takes its name from the wooden instrument, basically a wooden frame strung with fine metal wire, called a chitarra (guitar), used to cut the pasta.
- mazzarelle – lamb's lung and innards wrapped in beet greens or chard and braised in white wine or tomato sauce. Not for the faint of heart and not to be confused with mozzarella cheese.
- virtù – a vegetable soup typically prepared in May of each year to celebrate spiritual redemption and the bountiful virtues of the Earth. It is made with a wide variety of locally grown vegetables and typically includes "annit" (a type of wild fennel).
- tacchino alla canzanese – a dish famous in the nearby provincial town of Canzano. Made by slow baking a turkey in gelatin (an ancient method of preserving meat) and typically served cold.
- vino cotto – a fortified wine, found also in the Marche region, produced by slowly boiling down grape juice before fermentation and aging thus producing a sweet and rich dessert-type of wine. Consumed both straight up and in cooking.
- caggiunitti – deep fried almond fritters typically made with chocolate and chestnuts.
- bocconotti – traditional Teramo dish, known with different variations in the rest of Italy, sweet typical of Montorio Al Vomano (city in the province of Teramo) covered with shortcrust pastry and stuffed with grape jam, chocolate and toasted almonds.

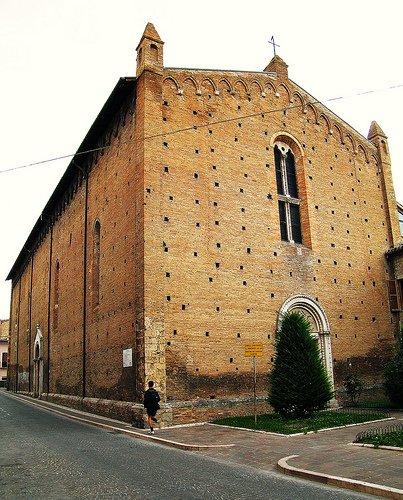
Church of San Domenico.

== Transportation ==
Teramo is located 150 kilometres (93 miles) away from Rome, to which it is connected through the A24 highway called Teramo-Rome. By railways, Teramo is connected with Pescara.

The nearest airport is the “Abruzzo Airport”. It is 65 kilometres (40 miles) away from the city center and it is connected to the city through highway A14.

== See also ==
- Colle Caruno
- Museo Civico di Teramo
- Museo archeologico Francesco Savini
