= Praetutii =

Ancient Italic people

The Praetutii were an ancient Italic tribe of central Italy. They are thought to have lived around Interamnia (or Interamna), which became modern Teramo, and to have given their name to Abruzzo. The ancient accounts, however, are substantially confused, when it comes to more precise location and details.

== Sources ==
We have no account of the origin of the Praetutii, or how they differed from the Picentes. The chief city of the Praetutii was Interamna, called for distinction's sake Interamna Praetutiana. They occupied a district of Picenum, bounded by the river Vomanus (modern Vomano) on the south and apparently by the stream called by Pliny the Albula on the north; but the Albula cannot be identified with certainty, and the text of Pliny may be corrupt as well as confused. He appears to place the Albula north of the Truentus (modern Tronto); but it is certain that the Praetutii did not extend as far to the north as the latter river, and it is probable that the stream now called the Salinello was their northern limit. The editors of the Encyclopædia Britannica Eleventh Edition, citing Pliny iii. 110, place the tribe's northern limit at the Tessinnus (another unidentified hydronym).

The Ager Praetutianus is mentioned by Livy and Polybius, as well as by Pliny, as a well-known district, and Ptolemy even distinguishes it altogether from Picenum, in which, however, it was certainly generally comprised. But the name seems to have continued in general use, and became corrupted in the Middle Ages into Prutium and Aprutium, from whence the modern name of Abruzzo is generally thought to be derived.

Ptolemy also assigns to them the town of Beregra. And the editors of the 1911 Encyclopædia Britannica, based on their interpretation of Pliny's text assign the towns of Castrum Novum and Truentus to the tribe. Pliny mentions the Ager Palmensis in close connection with the Praetutii; but this appears to have been only a small district, which was celebrated, as was the Praetutian region generally, for the excellence of its wines.
