= Frondarola =

Coordinates: 42°036′051″N 13°038′056″E

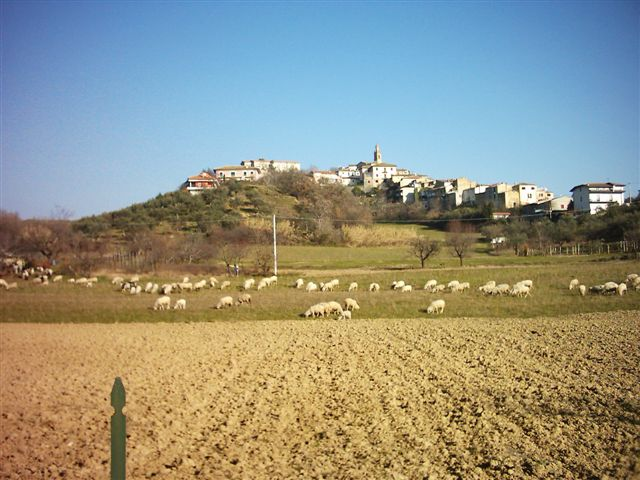
View of Frondarola

Location of the province of Teramo

Frondarola is a small town in the province of Teramo in the Abruzzo region of Italy, population about 200. It lies at an altitude of 1502 feet above sea level and is located about 5 miles from Teramo, of which it is a frazione.

== History ==
Archeological evidence points to the existence of Frondarola in the pre-Roman era, although the name comes from the Latin furnus arola, land belonging to the Furnus family.

The earliest known public document referencing the town is found in an act in which Count Trasmondo di Sifredo donates the Castle of Fornarolo to the church "Aprutina" in the year 1076. Approximately 10 years later Count Teutone di Ranieri mentions the passing of this donation to Ugone, Bishop of Teramo. Following its destruction 1156 by the Loretello's mercenary troops, the noblemen living in Frondarola fled to the surrounding countryside and villas. Later the Melatini family took possession of the land and became the most important feudal leaders of the area.

The city is located at the watershed of the Tordino and Vomano valleys. Looking out from Frondarola one can see the peaks of the Gran Sasso and the Monti della Laga mountains, as well as the hills of the Pescara and Ascoli Piceno areas of Abruzzo.

== Sights ==
The town is known for its church, Holy Salvatore.
