= Pastore (surname) =

Pastore is a surname. Notable people with the surname include:

- Ada I. Pastore (1906–1952), Argentine botanist, curator, teacher, and explorer
- Affonso Celso Pastore (1938–2024), Brazilian economist and banker
- Aldo Pastore (1930–2022), Italian politician
- Andrea Pastore (born 1994), Italian footballer
- Annalisa Pastore, chemist and molecular biologist
- Donna Pastore (contemporary), American professor; president of the National Association for Girls and Women in Sport
- Felice Pastore (1786–1862), Italian nobleman
- Frank Pastore (1957 – 2012), American baseball player and radio host
- Garry Pastore (born 1961), American actor, stuntman, writer, and filmmaker
- Gianpiero Pastore (born 1976), Italian fencer
- Girolamo Pastore (late 19th century), Italian painter
- Javier Pastore (born 1989), Argentine football player
- Joaquin Pastore (born 1981), Uruguayan rugby player
- John Pastore (1907–2000), American lawyer and politician
- Louis Pastore (1931–2020), American politician and businessman
- Luigi Pastore (1834–1913), Italian painter
- Mauro Pastore (born 1967), Italian designer
- Nick Pastore (contemporary), American law enforcement officer from Connecticut
- Ottavio Pastore (1887–1965), Italian politician and journalist
- Pierfranco Pastore (1927–2015), Roman Catholic bishop
- Pietro Pastore (1903–1968), Italian footballer
- Ralph T. Pastore, historian and archaeologist
- Rodrigo Pastore (born 1972), Argentine basketball player and coach
- Sergio Pastore (1932–1987), Italian director and screenwriter
- Tony Pastore (born 1966), Australian footballer
- Valentino Annibale Pastore (1868–1956), Italian philosopher and logician
- Vincent Pastore (1946–2026), American actor

== See also ==
- Pastor (surname)
- Pastore (disambiguation)
