= Cecere =

Cecere is a surname. Notable people with the surname include:

- Alyssa Cecere (born 1987), Canadian ice hockey player
- Antonio Cecere (born 1978), Italian writer
- Carlo Cecere (1706–1761), Italian composer
- Domenico Cecere (1972–2023), Italian footballer
- Fulvio Cecere (born 1960), Canadian actor and filmmaker
- Gaetano Cecere (1894–1985), American sculptor
- Jennifer Cecere (born 1950), American artist
- Mike Cecere (born 1968), British footballer
- Vincenzo Cecere (1897–1955), Italian painter
