= Piola =

Piola may refer to:

- Piola (beetle), a genus of beetles
- Piola (Milan Metro), a railway station in Milan, Italy
- Piyāla or piola, a type of bowl for drinking tea
- Valle Piola, a deserted village in the Abruzzo Region of Italy

== People with the surname ==
- Alonso Piola (born 1979), Italian Brazilian footballer
- Domenico Piola (1627–1703), Italian painter
- Gabrio Piola (1794–1850), Italian physicist
- Paolo Gerolamo Piola (1666–1724), Italian painter
- Pellegrino Piola (1617–1640), Italian painter
- Silvio Piola (1913–1996), Italian footballer
