= Pastore =

Pastore may refer to:

- Pastore (surname), Italian surname
- Pastore Peak, mountain in the Karakoram region of Pakistan close to the China border, near the famous K2 mountain
- Palazzo Pastore, building in Alcamo, Italy
- Pastore della Lessinia e del Lagorai, Italian dog breed from Triveneto
- Pia Opera Pastore, private charitable institution

== See also ==
- Pastor (disambiguation)
- Il re pastore (disambiguation)
