= Ioanella =

Coordinates: 42°39′50.10″N 13°37′15.77″E

Ioanella is a frazione (outlying area) of the Commune of Torricella Sicura in the Province of Teramo, Italy.

== Gallery ==
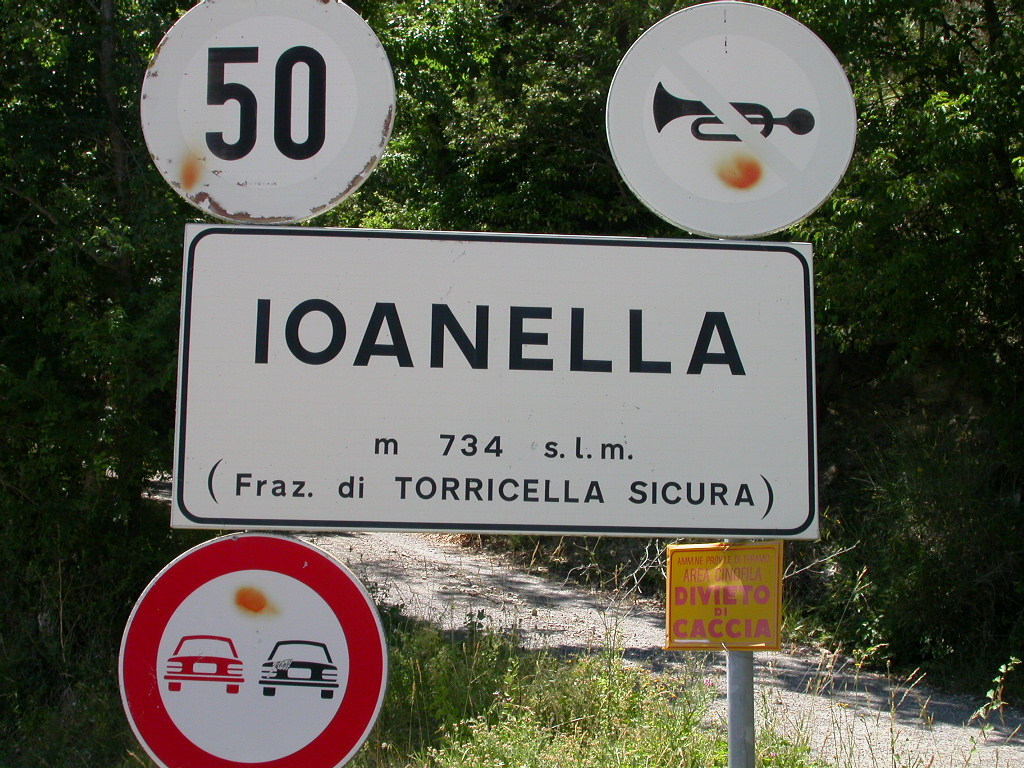
Entrance sign to Ioanella

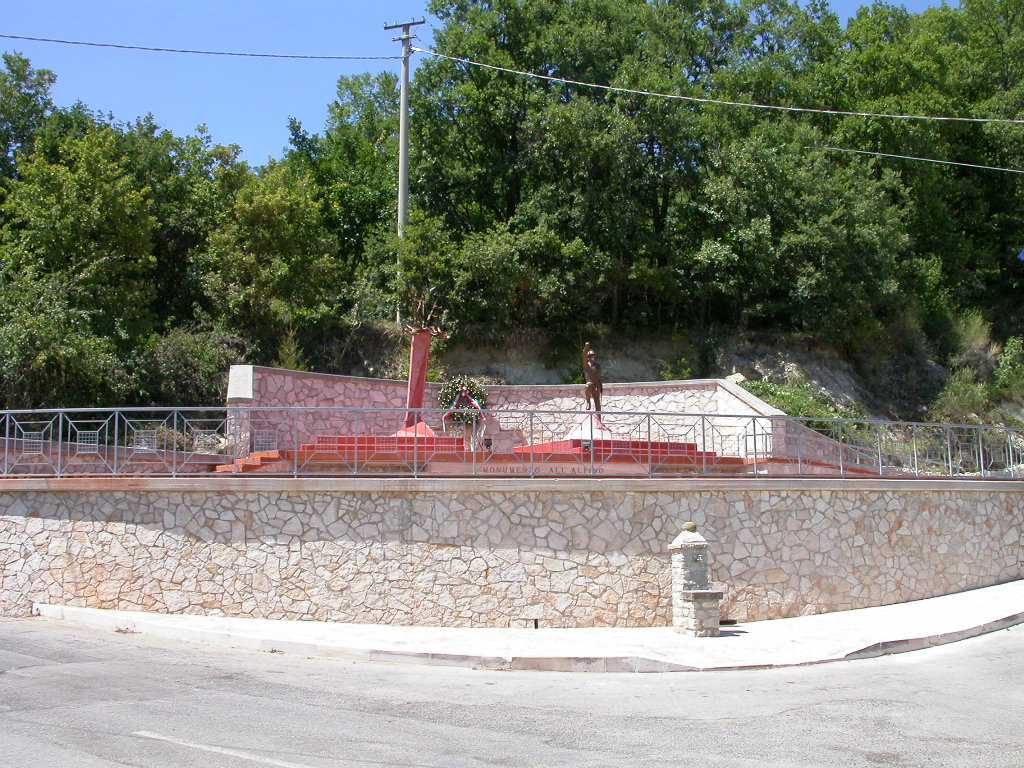
Monumento Alpini

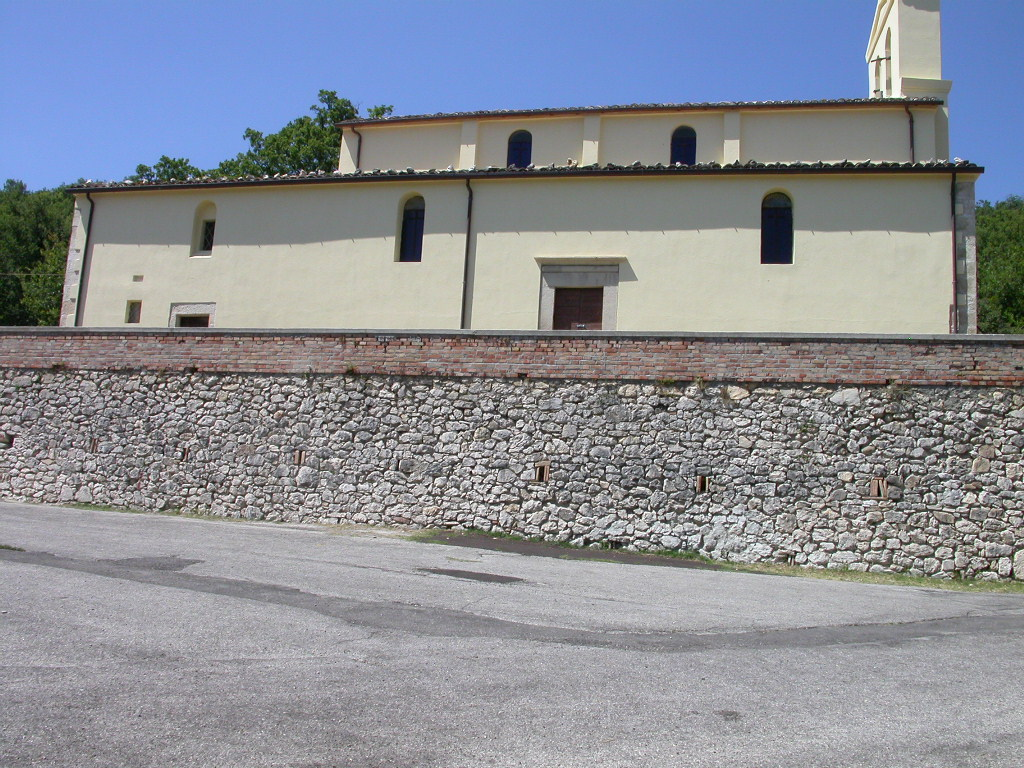
Side view of the church S. Maria Assunta

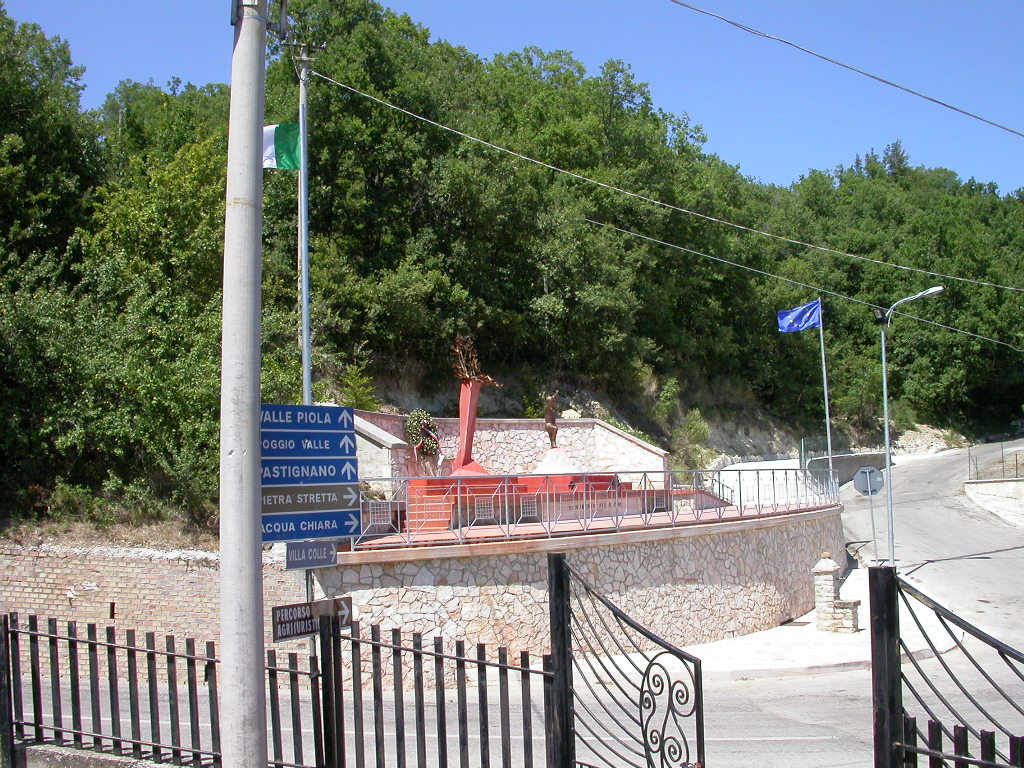
View from the church S. Maria Assunta of Monument

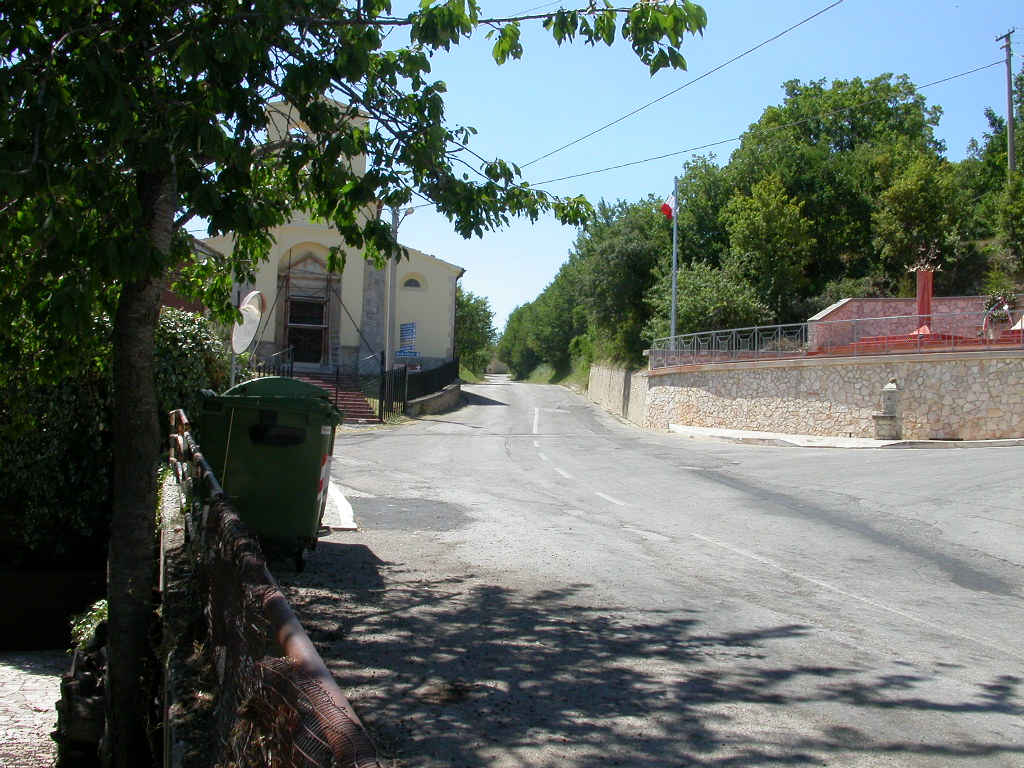
View of S. Maria Assunta church on main street

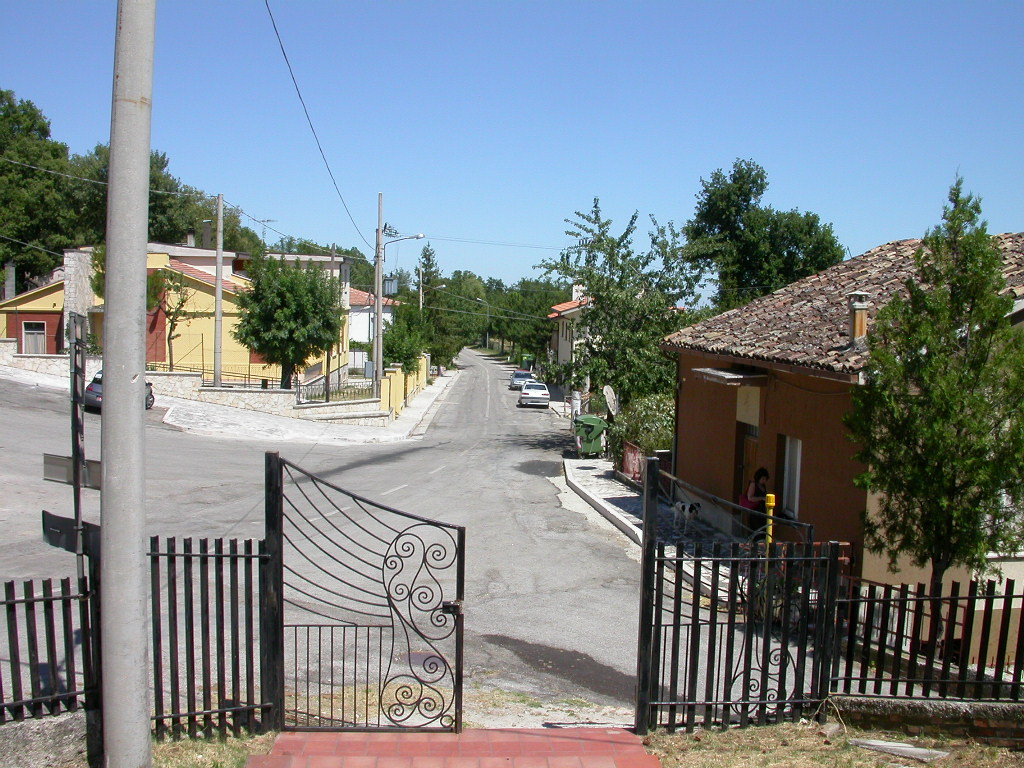
View of the main street from the S. Maria Assunta church entrance.

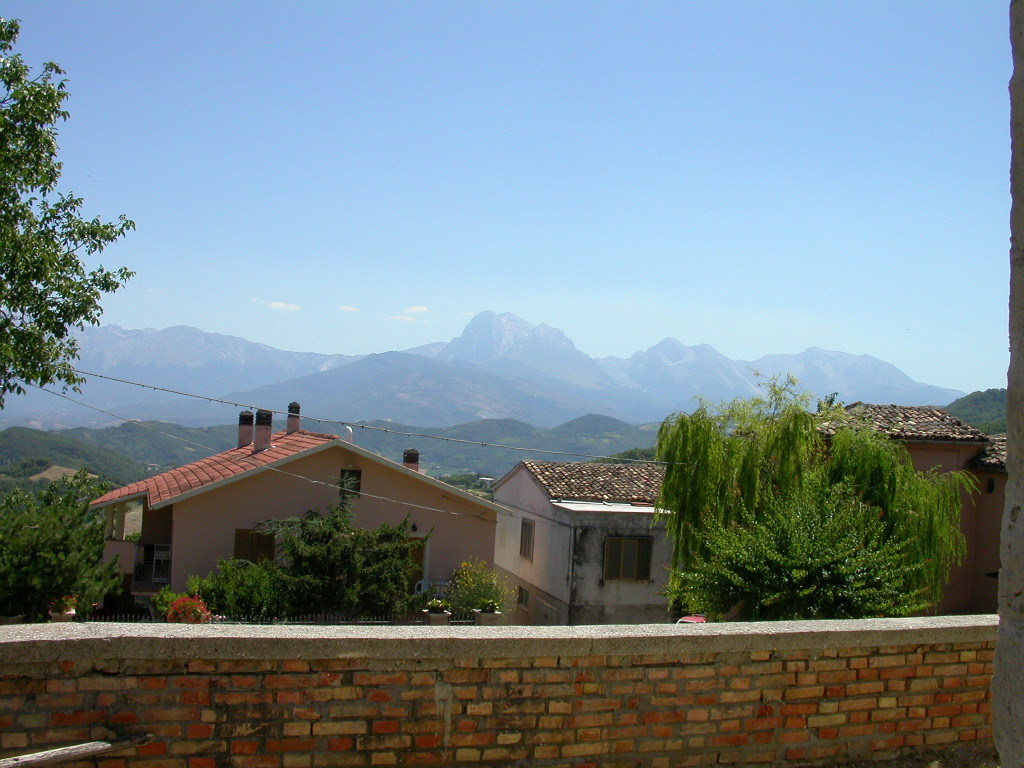
View of Gran Sasso D`Italia the highest point of the Alpennini mountains which stands at 2,914 metres

== See also ==
- Torricella Sicura
- Villa Popolo
