= Luca Anania =

Italian footballer

Personal information
- Full name: Luca Anania
- Date of birth: 21 June 1980 (age 46)
- Place of birth: Milan, Italy
- Height: 1.83 m (6 ft 0 in)
- Position: Goalkeeper

Youth career
- Internazionale

Senior career*
Years	Team	Apps	(Gls)
1999–2000	Internazionale	0	(0)
1999–2000	→ Lecco (loan)	8	(0)
2000–2002	Pro Sesto	10	(0)
2002	→ Pro Vercelli (loan)	12	(0)
2002–2004	Avellino	9	(0)
2004–2007	Lecce	3	(0)
2005–2006	→ Catanzaro (loan)	8	(0)
2006–2007	→ Grosseto (loan)	10	(0)
2007	→ Pavia (loan)	13	(0)
2007–2011	Pro Patria	80	(0)
2009–2010	→ Ravenna (loan)	30	(0)
2011–2012	Pescara	35	(0)
2012–2013	Padova	19	(0)
2013–2014	Livorno	3	(0)
2014	Catania	6	(0)
- * Club domestic league appearances and goals

Luca Anania (born 21 June 1980 in Milan) is a retired Italian goalkeeper.

== Career ==
Anania started his career at hometown giant Internazionale. He was loaned to Serie C1 side Lecco then sold to Serie C2 side Pro Sesto along with Marco D'Adda in co-ownership, for a peppercorn of 1 million lire (€516). In June 2001, Pro Sesto acquired D'Adda outright and renewed the co-ownership deal of Anania. Anania remained in Sesto San Giovanni for first half of the season, joined along with Alonso Piola who loaned to the club from Inter in September. But after nil league appearance, he left for Pro Vercelli on loan, which is his first club outside Lombardy region. In June 2002, Anania was bought back by Inter and sold to Avellino in another co-ownership deal, and sent other players to Pro Sesto. He worked as the backup of Domenico Cecere. In June 2003, he was signed outright by Serie C1 Group B champion. After played 9 league matches for Avellino at Serie B, he was signed by Serie A side Lecce in July 2004 where he worked as the understudy of Vincenzo Sicignano and made his Serie A debut on the opening match against Atalanta, replaced Sicignano in the 61st minutes. The match ended in 2–2 draw after Valeri Bojinov scored the equalized goal in the 76th minutes. After the club signed Francesco Benussi, Anania joined Serie B side Catanzaro but the club went bankrupt at the end of season.

In 2006–07 season he joined Serie C1 side Grosseto and competed with Angelo Pagotto for first choice. On 1 February 2007 he left for Pavia along with midfielder Manuel Scalise and Pagotto to Crotone after the club signed keeper Salvatore Pinna.

In 2007–08 season he joined Serie C1 side Pro Patria from Lecce. He was the regular of the team and entered the promotion playoffs in 2009. But all 4 playoffs were played by his understudy Marco Giambruno and lost to Padova in the final return leg.

After the club signed Nicholas Caglioni, on 1 August 2009, Anania left for fellow third division club Ravenna which also played in 2008–09 season promotion playoffs but lost to Padova in first round/semi-final. And Ravenna also moved from Group A to Group B by Lega Pro. Anania was the regular for the Emilia–Romagna side but both Ravenna and Pro Patria were slipped to relegation zone and eventually Pro Patria relegated.

== Honours ==
Avellino

- Serie C1: 2002–03

Grosseto

- Serie C1: 2006–07
