= Piola quiabentiae =

Scientific classification
- Kingdom: Animalia
- Phylum: Arthropoda
- Class: Insecta
- Order: Coleoptera
- Suborder: Polyphaga
- Infraorder: Cucujiformia
- Family: Cerambycidae
- Subfamily: Lamiinae
- Tribe: Phacellini
- Genus: Piola
- Species: P. quiabentiae

Binomial name
- Piola quiabentiae Marinoni, 1974

Species of beetle

Piola quiabentiae is a species of long-horned beetle in the family Cerambycidae. It known from Bolivia, Brazil, Argentina, and Paraguay.
