= Piola rubra =

Scientific classification
- Kingdom: Animalia
- Phylum: Arthropoda
- Class: Insecta
- Order: Coleoptera
- Suborder: Polyphaga
- Infraorder: Cucujiformia
- Family: Cerambycidae
- Subfamily: Lamiinae
- Tribe: Phacellini
- Genus: Piola
- Species: P. rubra

Binomial name
- Piola rubra Martins & Galileo, 1999

Species of beetle

Piola rubra is a species of long-horned beetle in the family Cerambycidae. It is known from Bolivia.
