= Andrea Pansera =

Italian footballer (born 1979)

Personal information
- Date of birth: December 28, 1979 (age 46)
- Place of birth: Milan, Italy
- Height: 1.90 m (6 ft 3 in)
- Position: Goalkeeper

Senior career*
Years	Team	Apps	(Gls)
1997–1998	Ospitaletto	1	(0)
1998–1999	Oggiono	34	(0)
1999	Atalanta	0	(0)
2000–2001	Meda	29	(0)
2001–2002	AlbinoLeffe	15	(0)
2002–2005	Bologna	0	(0)
2005–2006	Messina	1	(0)
2006–2007	Padova	0	(0)
2007	Massese	2	(0)
2007–2009	Sestese (Calende)	49	(0)
2009–2010	Lecco	26	(0)
2010–2012	Tritium	58	(0)
2012	Darfo Boario	16	(0)
- * Club domestic league appearances and goals as of 23:30, 30 April 2010 (UTC)

Andrea Pansera (born December 28, 1979) is an Italian former professional football player who last played for Tritium Calcio 1908.

He played his only Serie A game on May 14, 2006, for Messina against Palermo when he came on as a substitute in the 80th minute for Nicholas Caglioni. On 10 July 2009, as a free agent, he was signed by Lecco along with Marco Francini. At the end of the season the team got relegated and he decides to join Tritium. The team finished as the winner of Group A of 2010–11 Lega Pro Seconda Divisione as well as 2011 Supercoppa di Lega di Seconda Divisione. After being released by Tritium he was signed by Serie D club Darfo Boario.
