= Piola unicolor =

Scientific classification
- Kingdom: Animalia
- Phylum: Arthropoda
- Class: Insecta
- Order: Coleoptera
- Suborder: Polyphaga
- Infraorder: Cucujiformia
- Family: Cerambycidae
- Subfamily: Lamiinae
- Tribe: Phacellini
- Genus: Piola
- Species: P. unicolor

Binomial name
- Piola unicolor Martins & Galileo, 1999

Species of beetle

Piola unicolor is a species of Long-Horned Beetle in the beetle family Cerambycidae. It is known from Brazil.
