= Marco Giambruno =

Italian footballer

Personal information
- Date of birth: 4 December 1984 (age 41)
- Place of birth: Palermo, Italy
- Height: 1.80 m (5 ft 11 in)
- Position: Goalkeeper

Team information
- Current team: Como

Youth career
- Messina
- 2002–2004: Roma
- 2002–2004: → Messina (loan)

Senior career*
Years	Team	Apps	(Gls)
2004–2005	Roma	0	(0)
2004–2005	→ Tolentino (loan)	6	(0)
2005–2007	Pisa	2	(0)
2007–2008	Portogruaro	4	(0)
2009–2010	Pro Patria	12	(0)
2011–	Como		
- * Club domestic league appearances and goals

Marco Giambruno (born 4 December 1984) is an Italian footballer who plays as a goalkeeper for Como at Lega Pro Prima Divisione.

== Career ==
=== Early career and Roma ===
Born in Palermo, Sicily, Giambruno started his career at Messina. In summer 2002, he was exchanged with Armando Guastella in co-ownership deal, both tagged for €2.5 million nominal value for 50% rights. He signed a 5-year contract. In June 2004, Roma gave up the remain rights of Guastella and Messina sold the remains rights of Giambruno to Roma for a fee of €70,000. It made Roma registered a financial income of €2.43 million for Giambruno and €2.5 million financial cost for Guastella, which in total a cost of €70,000.

=== Lega Pro clubs ===
In summer 2005, he was sold to Pisa in another co-ownership deal for just €500. In summer 2007, he left for Portogruaro. In March 2009, he signed for Pro Patria, as the backup of Luca Anania.

In 2009-10 season, he worked as Nicholas Caglioni's backup. Without a club for 1 season, in July 2011 he joined Calcio Como, replacing departed Paolo Castelli. Giambruno made his debut in the first round of 2011–12 Coppa Italia.
