= South Plantation High School =

Public high school in Florida, US

Location
- 1300 SW 54th Ave; Plantation, Florida 33317; United States; 26.1031°N 80.2201°W

Information
- School type: Public
- Founded: 1971
- School district: Broward County Public Schools
- Superintendent: Peter B. Licata
- Principal: Alex Ries
- Staff: 96.00 (FTE)
- Grades: 9-12
- Student to teacher ratio: 23.88
- Hours in school day: 7
- Colours: Purple and gold
- Slogan: Exceeding the Bar
- Athletics: Cross Country, Track and field, Bowling, Soccer, Football, Basketball, Baseball, Softball, Waterpolo, Lacrosse, Golf, Flag Football, and Swim
- Mascot: Joe Paladin
- Nickname: Paladins
- Rival: Plantation High School
- Accreditation: Cognia and Southern Association of Colleges and Schools (SACS)
- National ranking: 6,513
- Newspaper: The Sword & Shield
- Yearbook: Prospectus
- Website: southplantation.browardschools.com

South Plantation High School is a four-year public high school in the city of Plantation, Florida, United States.

SPHS is part of the Broward County Public Schools district, which is the sixth-largest district in the nation with over 271,500 students enrolled as of the 2025–2026 school year. The school was named a Blue Ribbon School of Excellence in 1982 and 1983. South Plantation had a school grade of "B" for the 2024–25 academic year.

South Plantation High School is a magnet school, focusing on environmental science, Everglades restoration, and CTE courses as well.

== Demographics ==
As of the 2025–26 school year, the total student enrollment was 2,235.

== Attendance zone ==
The school serves sections of Plantation, Broadview Park, Fort Lauderdale, and Davie. The magnet school serves students from anywhere in the BCPS district.

== Notable alumni ==
- Richard Bleier (born 1987), Major League Baseball pitcher with the Boston Red Sox
- Jay Burna, hip hop & pop artist, songwriter
- Laurie Cardoza-Moore, activist, film producer and Evangelical leader
- Robbie Chosen, NFL wide receiver
- Colin Cole, former NFL player
- Alex Collins (1994–2023), former NFL running back
- Reggie Cross, former basketball player
- Benjamin Crump, attorney specializing in civil rights and catastrophic personal injury cases
- Erin DiMeglio, first female Florida high school quarterback
- Diplo, American DJ and music producer
- Wayne Federman, comedian, film, and television actor; author
- John Franklin III, professional wide receiver for the Memphis Showboats
- Zane Hijazi, podcaster and Internet personality
- Heath Hussar, podcaster and Internet personality
- Travis Shelton, NFL athlete, kick returner Denver Broncos
- Marc Kudisch (born 1966), Broadway actor
- Andrew Mayne, television personality (Don't Trust Andrew Mayne, Shark Week), WSJ best-selling novelist
- George Noriega, Grammy-winning songwriter and record producer
- Donna Pastore, professor, collegiate softball coach and player, University of Florida Hall of Fame
- Alfredo Roberts, former NFL player and NFL coach
- Ricco Ross, film and television actor
- Justin Robert Young, podcaster and Internet personality
