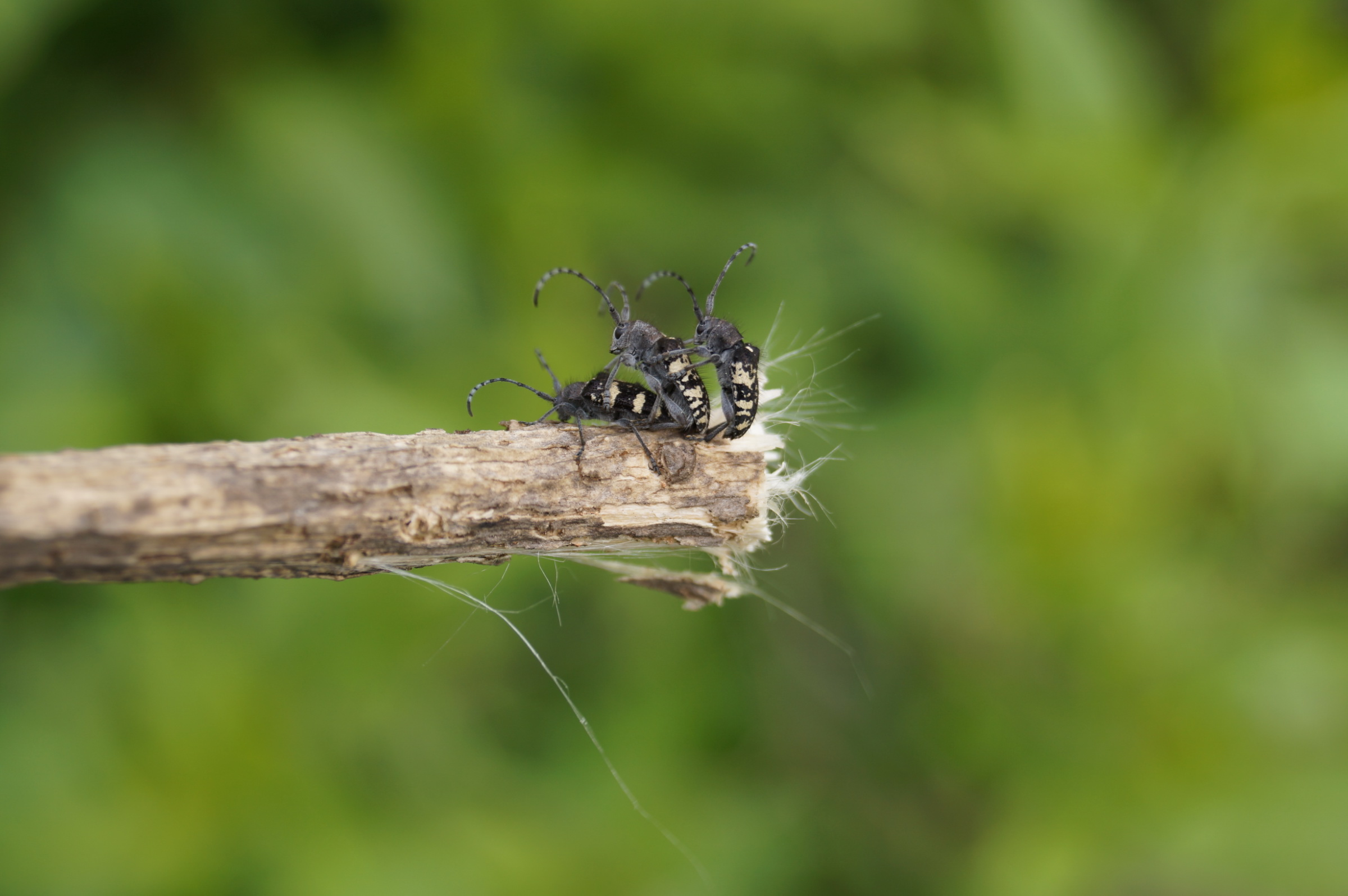

Scientific classification
- Kingdom: Animalia
- Phylum: Arthropoda
- Clade: Pancrustacea
- Class: Insecta
- Order: Coleoptera
- Suborder: Polyphaga
- Infraorder: Cucujiformia
- Family: Cerambycidae
- Genus: Brachychilus
- Species: B. scutellaris

Binomial name
- Brachychilus scutellaris Blanchard in Gay, 1851

= Brachychilus scutellaris =

Species of beetle

Brachychilus scutellaris is a species of beetle in the family Cerambycidae. It was described by Blanchard in 1851. It is known from Chile and Argentina. It contains the varietas Brachychilus scutellaris var. irroratus.
