= Pastor (surname) =

Pastor is an occupational surname for the profession of a religious (usually Christian) pastor and the profession of a shepherd pastor. Notable people with the surname include:

- Amy Wynn Pastor (born 1976), American reality show performer
- Aurelio Pastor (born 1967), Peruvian politician
- Beatriz Pastor, American politician
- Ed Pastor (1943–2018), American politician from Arizona
- Ernesto Pastor (1892–1921), Puerto Rican bullfighter
- Facundo Pastor (born 1979), Argentine radio journalist
- Frank Pastor (born 1957), East German footballer
- George Pastor (born 1963), American soccer player
- Gildo Pastor (1910–1990), Monegasque businessman and property developer.
- Gildo Pallanca Pastor (born 1967), Monegasque businessman, CEO and owner of Venturi Automobiles
- Hélène Pastor (1937–2014), heiress and businesswoman from Monaco
- Lubos Pastor (born 1974), Slovak-American economist
- Ludwig von Pastor (1854–1928), German historian and diplomat for Austria
- Manuel Rivas Pastor (born 1960), Spanish chess grandmaster
- Michel Pastor (1944–2014), Monegasque businessman and art collector
- Paco Cabanes Pastor (1954–2021), Spanish Valencian pilota player
- Robert Pastor (1947–2014), American scholar; national security adviser to President Jimmy Carter
- Rosana Pastor (born 1960), Spanish actress
- Thierry Pastor (born 1960), French singer
- Tony Pastor (1837–1908), American impresario, variety performer and theatre owner
- Tony Pastor (bandleader) (1907–1969), Italian-American singer and saxophonist
- Toon Pastor (1929–2008), Dutch boxer

== See also ==
- Pastore (surname)
- Pastor (disambiguation)
