= Scolochilus lautus =

Scientific classification
- Kingdom: Animalia
- Phylum: Arthropoda
- Class: Insecta
- Order: Coleoptera
- Suborder: Polyphaga
- Infraorder: Cucujiformia
- Family: Cerambycidae
- Genus: Scolochilus
- Species: S. lautus

Binomial name
- Scolochilus lautus Monné & Tavakilian, 1988

Species of beetle

Scolochilus lautus is a species of beetle in the family Cerambycidae. It was described by Monné and Tavakilian in 1988. It is known from Brazil French Guiana.
