= Mpanjaka collenettei =

Scientific classification
- Domain: Eukaryota
- Kingdom: Animalia
- Phylum: Arthropoda
- Class: Insecta
- Order: Lepidoptera
- Superfamily: Noctuoidea
- Family: Erebidae
- Genus: Mpanjaka
- Species: M. collenettei

Binomial name
- Mpanjaka collenettei (Griveaud, 1974)

Synonyms
- Dasychira collenettei Griveaud, 1974

Species of moth

Mpanjaka collenettei is a moth of the family Erebidae first described by Paul Griveaud in 1974. It is found in central Madagascar.

It has a wingspan of 35 mm and the length of the forewings is 17 mm.

== See also ==
- List of moths of Madagascar
