= Brachychilus wagenknechti =

Scientific classification
- Kingdom: Animalia
- Phylum: Arthropoda
- Class: Insecta
- Order: Coleoptera
- Suborder: Polyphaga
- Infraorder: Cucujiformia
- Family: Cerambycidae
- Genus: Brachychilus
- Species: B. wagenknechti

Binomial name
- Brachychilus wagenknechti Cerda, 1954

Synonyms
- Brachychilus lituratus wagenknechti Cerda, 1954

Species of beetle

Brachychilus wagenknechti is a species of beetle in the family Cerambycidae. It was described by Cerda in 1954. It is known from Chile.
