= Travis Shelton =

American gridiron football player (born 1985)

Profile
- Positions: Wide receiver, kick returner

Personal information
- Born: April 23, 1985 (age 41); Fort Lauderdale, Florida, U.S.
- Listed height: 5 ft 11 in (1.80 m)
- Listed weight: 185 lb (84 kg)

Career information
- High school: South Plantation (Plantation, Florida)
- College: Temple
- NFL draft: 2009: undrafted

Career history
- Denver Broncos (2009–2010); Hartford Colonials (2010)*; Winnipeg Blue Bombers (2010–2011)
- * Offseason or practice squad member only

Awards and highlights
- Second-team All-MAC (2008)

Travis Shelton (born April 23, 1985) is an American former professional football wide receiver and professional boxer who played college football for the Temple Owls and was signed by the Denver Broncos of the National Football League (NFL). Shelton also played for the Winnipeg Blue Bombers of the Canadian Football League (CFL) in 2010.

== Early life ==
Shelton attended South Plantation High School in Plantation, Florida. In addition to football, in which he played as a wide receiver, running back, kick returner, and punt returner, Shelton also competed in track and field, placing eighth nationally in the 60-meter dash.

== College career ==
In his freshman season, Shelton played in seven games for the Temple Owls, recording his first career touchdown against the Bowling Green Falcons. He also competed for the track and field team.

After redshirting his sophomore year, Shelton played in six games in his junior year. He set a school record for most return yards in a game, with 205 against the Clemson Tigers.

Shelton played in 12 games during his senior year, and returned as a fifth-year senior to play in 11 games in 2008. He set Temple's school record in career kickoff return yards, with 2,507. He was named second-team All-MAC as a kickoff returner in 2008.

== Professional career ==
=== Denver Broncos ===
After going unselected in the 2009 NFL draft, Shelton signed with the Denver Broncos.

=== Winnipeg Blue Bombers ===
On April 20, 2010, Shelton signed as a free agent with the Winnipeg Blue Bombers of the Canadian Football League.

=== Hartford Colonials ===
On August 3, 2010, Shelton signed as a free agent with the Hartford Colonials of the United Football League.

=== Boxing ===
Shelton began a professional boxing career in 2013.

== Personal life ==
Shelton is the first cousin of both NFL wide receiver Devin Hester and NFL linebacker Andra Davis.
