= Scolochilus maculatus =

Scientific classification
- Kingdom: Animalia
- Phylum: Arthropoda
- Class: Insecta
- Order: Coleoptera
- Suborder: Polyphaga
- Infraorder: Cucujiformia
- Family: Cerambycidae
- Genus: Scolochilus
- Species: S. maculatus

Binomial name
- Scolochilus maculatus Monné, 1979

Species of beetle

Scolochilus maculatus is a species of beetle in the family Cerambycidae. It was described by Monné in 1979. It is known from Brazil.
