= Mpanjaka =

Scientific classification
- Domain: Eukaryota
- Kingdom: Animalia
- Phylum: Arthropoda
- Class: Insecta
- Order: Lepidoptera
- Superfamily: Noctuoidea
- Family: Erebidae
- Tribe: Orgyiini
- Genus: Mpanjaka; Griveaud, 1976

Genus of moths

Mpanjaka is a genus of moths in the subfamily Lymantriinae. The genus was erected by Paul Griveaud in 1976.

== Species ==
Some of the species are:

- Mpanjaka albovirida (Griveaud, 1970)
- Mpanjaka betschi (Griveaud, 1974)
- Mpanjaka collenettei (Griveaud, 1974)
- Mpanjaka conioptera (Collenette, 1936)
- Mpanjaka cyrtozona (Collenette, 1936)
- Mpanjaka disjunctifascia (Collenette, 1936)
- Mpanjaka elegans (Butler, 1882)
- Mpanjaka euthyzona (Collenette, 1959)
- Mpanjaka gentilis (Butler, 1879)
- Mpanjaka grandidieri (Butler, 1882)
- Mpanjaka junctifascia (Collenette, 1936)
- Mpanjaka leucopicta (Collenette, 1936)
- Mpanjaka montana (Griveaud, 1974)
- Mpanjaka nigrosparsata (Kenrick, 1914)
- Mpanjaka olsoufieffae (Collenette, 1936)
- Mpanjaka pastor (Butler, 1882)
- Mpanjaka perinetensis (Collenette, 1936)
- Mpanjaka pyrsonota (Collenette, 1939)
- Mpanjaka renominata (Strand, 1915)
- Mpanjaka titan (Collenette, 1959)
- Mpanjaka vibicipennis (Butler, 1879)
- Mpanjaka viola (Butler, 1879)

== See also ==
- List of moths of Madagascar
