= Colin Cole (American football) =

Canadian gridiron football player (born 1980)

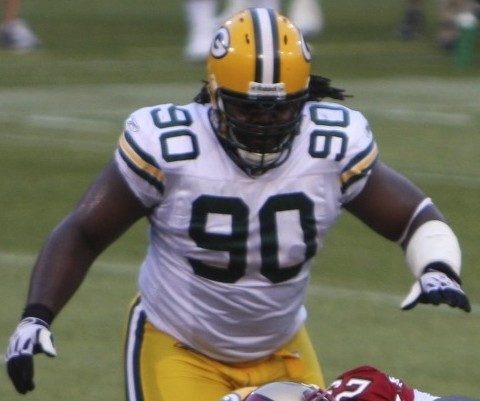
- Cole with the Green Bay Packers in 2008

No. 90, 91
- Position: Defensive tackle

Personal information
- Born: June 24, 1980 (age 46); Toronto, Ontario, Canada
- Listed height: 6 ft 2 in (1.88 m)
- Listed weight: 325 lb (147 kg)

Career information
- High school: South Plantation (Plantation, Florida, U.S.)
- College: Iowa (1999–2002)
- NFL draft: 2003: undrafted

Career history
- Minnesota Vikings (2003); Detroit Lions (2003); Green Bay Packers (2004–2008); Seattle Seahawks (2009–2010); Carolina Panthers (2013–2015)

Awards and highlights
- First-team All-Big Ten (2002)

Career NFL statistics
- Total tackles: 262
- Sacks: 5.5
- Forced fumbles: 1
- Fumble recoveries: 2
- Stats at Pro Football Reference

Colin Anthony Cole (born June 24, 1980) is a Canadian-American former professional football player who was a defensive tackle in the National Football League (NFL) for the Green Bay Packers, Seattle Seahawks, and Carolina Panthers. He was born in Toronto, Ontario, Canada, and raised in Fort Lauderdale, Florida. He played college football at the University of Iowa, where he earned first-team All-Big Ten honors as a senior in 2002. Cole signed with the Minnesota Vikings after going undrafted in the 2003 NFL draft.

After stints on the active rosters of both the Vikings and Detroit Lions without playing in any games, Cole signed with the Packers in 2004. He spent four seasons in Green Bay, and became a free agent after the 2008 season. In March 2009, Cole signed a five-year contract with the Seahawks despite not having started a game since 2006. He was the primary starter at defensive tackle for the Seahawks from 2009 to 2010. After two seasons away from the NFL, Cole signed with the Panthers in 2013 and was the team's primary starter during the 2013 and 2014 seasons. Cole was a member of the only two teams in NFL history to win playoff games despite having losing records: the 2010 Seahawks and the 2014 Panthers.

== Early life ==
Cole was born in Toronto, Ontario, Canada, and raised in Fort Lauderdale, Florida. He was not allowed to play youth football growing up due to being too big. He played high school football at South Plantation High School, earning second-team all-state and first-team all-county honors. He was also a four-year letterman in wrestling. He had a 23–1 wrestling record his junior year and won the state wrestling championship his senior year. Cole was a four-time county heavyweight champion and three-time regional champion as well.

== College career ==
Cole played college football for the Iowa Hawkeyes of the University of Iowa from 1999 to 2002. He was a four-year letterman and a three-year starter. He considered leaving Iowa as a freshman due to being homesick. He played in nine games overall in 1999 while also missing two contests due to injury. Cole started 11 of 12 games his sophomore year, and then was named honorable mention All-Big Ten his junior year in 2001. He switched from defensive end to defensive tackle for his senior season in 2002. Cole garnered first-team All-Big Ten recognition after recording 85 tackles (56 of which were solo) and nine sacks. He was a defensive co-captain in 2002 as well.

Cole appeared in 46 games, starting 36, during his college career, totaling 213 tackles (138 solo), 23 sacks, three forced fumbles, and three fumble recoveries. He graduated with a degree in African American Studies

== Professional career ==
=== Pre-draft ===
Cole was invited to the Senior Bowl after his college career but had a poor performance during the game. His weight had increased from about 305 to 315 pounds, with Cole stating "within five or six plays, I'm winded. It may have been the level of competition, but I think it was just more the weight that I wasn't used to." He had a 33 inch vertical jump and a 4.91 second 40-yard dash at Iowa's pro day. He was also put through offensive lineman drills at the NFL Combine. NFL draft evaluator Chris Landry predicted that Cole would be a sixth-round draft pick.

=== Minnesota Vikings ===
Cole signed with the Minnesota Vikings on May 2, 2003, after going undrafted in the 2003 NFL draft. He was waived on September 9 after the first game of the regular season, although the Vikings signed him to their practice squad on September 25. He was promoted to the active roster on October 1 before being waived again on October 7, 2003. Overall, Cole was on the 53-man roster for two games but did not play in any.

=== Detroit Lions ===
Before the final game of the regular season, Cole was signed by the Detroit Lions on December 23, 2003, due to Kalimba Edwards having been placed on injured reserve. However, Cole did not end up playing in the game. He was waived by the Lions on September 5, 2004, and signed to the practice squad on September 7. He was then released on September 8, 2004.

=== Green Bay Packers ===
Cole was signed to the Green Bay Packers' practice squad on September 16, 2004, and was promoted to the active roster on November 30, 2004. He was inactive for two games before playing in the final three games of the regular season, including his first career start in the season finale. Cole was inactive for the team's wildcard playoff game against the Vikings. He recorded six solo tackles and one assisted tackle for the Packers overall in 2004. He appeared in all 16 games, starting four, during the 2005 season, totaling 24 solo tackles, 15 assisted tackles, two sacks, and one pass breakup. Cole re-signed with the Packers on March 22, 2006, and lost ten pounds prior to the 2006 season. He played in 15 games, starting three, in 2006, accumulating 28 solo tackles, 10 assisted tackles, one sack, and one forced fumble. He was a healthy scratch for the September 24 game against the Lions. Cole signed a one-year deal with the Packers again on March 28, 2007, for the veteran minimum of $595,000.

Through the first 11 games of the 2007 season, Cole appeared in seven games and was inactive for four others. He sustained a concussion during practice on October 3, 2007. Overall in 2007, he recorded seven solo tackles, five assisted tackles, and one pass breakup, before being placed on injured reserve on November 26, 2007, due to suffering a fractured forearm in a game against the Lions. In 2008, the Packers extended a second-round ($1.417 million) tender to Cole, who was a restricted free agent. He signed the tender on April 17, 2008. He played in all 16 games (no starts) in 2008, totaling 19 solo tackles, 11 assisted tackles, 0.5 sacks, and four pass breakups. He became an unrestricted free agent after the 2008 season.

=== Seattle Seahawks ===
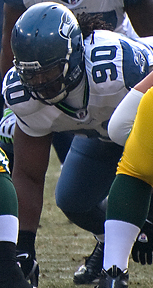
Cole with the Seattle Seahawks in 2009

Despite not having started a game since 2006 and only having posted 0.5 sacks in the prior two seasons, Cole signed a five-year contract worth $21.4 million, including $6 million in guaranteed money, with the Seattle Seahawks on March 1, 2009. He appeared in all 16 games, with a career-high 15 starts, for the Seahawks in 2009, accumulating 29 solo tackles, 19 assisted tackles, one fumble recovery, two pass breakups, and no sacks. Seattle finished the 2009 season with a 5–11 record. He appeared in 11 games, all starts, during the 2010 season, recording 36 solo tackles, eight assisted tackles, one sack, and five pass breakups. Cole missed five games due to a high ankle sprain but returned for the season finale. The Seahawks went 7–9 in 2010 but finished first in the NFC West. Cole started two playoff games for the Seahawks, posting five solo tackles, one assisted tackle, and one pass breakup. He was released by the team on September 3, 2011.

=== Carolina Panthers ===
After having not played in an NFL game since 2010, Cole was signed by the Carolina Panthers on February 7, 2013, for one year, $840,000 and no guaranteed money. The Panthers had reportedly not shown any interest in Cole until he cold called them. He was a backup for the first two games of the 2013 season but took over as starter after Dwan Edwards suffered an injury. Cole was later inactive for the final game of the season due to a strained calf. He played in 15 games, starting 13, overall in 2013, totaling nine solo tackles, six assisted tackles, and one sack. The Panthers finished the 2013 season with a 12–4 record. Cole posted two assisted tackles in a reserve role during the team's divisional round playoff loss to the San Francisco 49ers. Pro Football Focus rated Cole as the 61st best player at his position for the 2013 season.

On April 9, 2014, the Panthers re-signed Cole to a one-year deal worth $1.1 million. He appeared in all 16 games, starting 10, in 2014, recording 12 solo tackles, 16 assisted tackles, and one fumble recovery. Carolina went 7–8–1 but finished the 2014 season first in the NFC South. Cole played in two games, starting one, during the 2014 postseason and recorded one solo tackle and three assisted tackles. On March 3, 2015, he re-signed with the Panthers for one year and $1.0 million. Cole played in two games for the Panthers in 2015, making one assisted tackle, before being released on September 30, 2015. Cole was a member of the only two teams in NFL history to win playoff games despite having losing records: the 2010 Seahawks and the 2014 Panthers.

== NFL career statistics ==
Legend
**Bold**	Career high

=== Regular season ===
Year	Team	Games		Tackles					Interceptions					Fumbles			
Year	Team	GP	GS	Cmb	Solo	Ast	Sck	TFL	Int	Yds	TD	Lng	PD	FF	FR	Yds	TD
2004	GNB	3	1	7	6	1	0.0	1	0	0	0	0	0	0	0	0	0
2005	GNB	**16**	4	39	24	15	**2.0**	**4**	0	0	0	0	1	0	0	0	0
2006	GNB	15	3	38	28	10	1.0	3	0	0	0	0	0	**1**	0	0	0
2007	GNB	7	0	12	7	5	0.0	0	0	0	0	0	1	0	0	0	0
2008	GNB	**16**	0	30	19	11	0.5	2	0	0	0	0	4	0	0	0	0
2009	SEA	**16**	**15**	**48**	29	**19**	0.0	1	0	0	0	0	2	0	**1**	**2**	0
2010	SEA	11	11	44	**36**	8	1.0	3	0	0	0	0	**5**	0	0	0	0
2013	CAR	15	13	15	9	6	1.0	1	0	0	0	0	0	0	0	0	0
2014	CAR	**16**	10	28	12	16	0.0	**4**	0	0	0	0	0	0	**1**	0	0
2015	CAR	2	0	1	0	1	0.0	0	0	0	0	0	0	0	0	0	0
Career		117	57	262	170	92	5.5	19	0	0	0	0	13	1	2	2	0

=== Playoffs ===
Year	Team	Games		Tackles					Interceptions					Fumbles			
Year	Team	GP	GS	Cmb	Solo	Ast	Sck	TFL	Int	Yds	TD	Lng	PD	FF	FR	Yds	TD
2010	SEA	**2**	**2**	**6**	**5**	1	0.0	0	0	0	0	0	**1**	0	0	0	0
2013	CAR	1	0	2	0	2	0.0	0	0	0	0	0	0	0	0	0	0
2014	CAR	**2**	1	4	1	**3**	0.0	0	0	0	0	0	0	0	0	0	0
Career		5	3	12	6	6	0.0	0	0	0	0	0	1	0	0	0	0

== Personal life ==
During his NFL career, he started The Cole Group, LLC in order to help high school athletes pursue college sports. The company later branched out to organizing special events for professional athletes, non-profit organizations, and other businesses. Cole has also served as an NFLPA player representative. On October 24, 2008, his football jersey number was retired by South Plantation High School.
