= Pastor (disambiguation) =

A Pastor is the leader of a Christian congregation.

Pastor may also refer to:

== People ==
- Pastor (surname)
- Pastor Argudín Pedroso (1880–1968), Afro-Cuban painter
- Pastor Linares (born 1971), Venezuelan racing cyclist
- Pastor López (1944–2019), Venezuelan cumbia singer-songwriter
- Pastor Troy (born 1975), American rapper and record producer
- Pastor (footballer) (born 2000), David Samuel Custódio Lima, Brazilian footballer
- The pastor, which is what scholars call the real author of the pastoral epistles

== Religion ==
- Worship pastor, a person who ministers using contemporary worship or Christian music
- Pastor aeternus, 1870 document defining Catholic doctrines
- Pastor bonus, 1988 apostolic constitution

== Animals ==
- Pastor (bird), the genus for the bird known as the Rosy starling
- Pastor Garafiano, Spanish sheep dog breed
- Mpanjaka pastor, moth of the family Erebidae

== Films ==
- Pastor Hall, 1940 British drama film
- Pastor Brown, 2009 American Christian drama film
- The VelociPastor, 2017 American comedy horror film

== Other uses ==
- Al pastor, preparation of spit-grilled slices of pork in Mexican cuisine

== See also ==
- Pastores, town in Sacatepéquez, Guatemala
