= Scolochilus =

Scientific classification
- Kingdom: Animalia
- Phylum: Arthropoda
- Class: Insecta
- Order: Coleoptera
- Suborder: Polyphaga
- Infraorder: Cucujiformia
- Family: Cerambycidae
- Tribe: Phacellini
- Genus: Scolochilus

Genus of beetles

Scolochilus is a genus of longhorn beetles of the subfamily Lamiinae, containing the following species:

- Scolochilus lautus Monné & Tavakilian, 1988
- Scolochilus maculatus Monné, 1979
