= Luigi Pastore =

Italian painter (1834–1913)

Luigi Pastore (24 May 1834 – 19 January 1913) was an Italian painter.

Born in Aversa, Province of Caserta, to working-class parents, he studied at the Academy of Fine Arts of Naples, and painted mainly landscapes, historic and sacred subjects, or Neo-Pompeian themes. In 1885, at the Mostra Borbonica of Naples, he displayed The daughter of Titian, and in 1859, he sent St. Anthony Abbot mourning on the remains of St Paul, the first hermit. In 1874, he sent to the Promotrice partenopea the canvas Il cadavere di Coligny, and in 1879, La piccola operaia. In later years, he returned to his native town of Aversa, where he became an educator and sponsor of the arts.

Among his historical canvases are Il pentimento di Fanfulla di Lodi and La congiura di Marin Faliero. He also painted (now restored) lateral walls of the church of Santi Filippo e Giacomo in Aversa, and frescoes in the Palazzo municipale of Frattamaggiore, including Il cardinale Fabrizio Ruffo libera Aversa dai francesi. He also painted medallions with illustrious men of the town for the ceiling of the Council hall of the Palazzo municipale of Aversa.

Among his pupils were his grandson Girolamo Pastore, Giovanni Conti, and Vincenzo Cecere.
