= Erin DiMeglio =

American football and basketball player (born 1994)

- Born: October 22, 1994 (age 31)
- Occupations: Firefighter and EMT

Erin DiMeglio (born October 22, 1994) is a former high school football and basketball player, who attended the University of Central Florida. In 2013, Erin graduated from South Plantation High School, in Plantation, Florida. As a senior at her high school, Erin became the first female quarterback in Florida high school football history, as she was the third-string quarterback for the South Plantation High School football team during the 2012 season. On September 21, 2012, DiMeglio notched the first completed pass of her career, on her second attempt in the game. However, the play accounted for a loss of yardage, with the AP citing a 5-yard loss on the down and the South Florida Sun-Sentinel stating that it accounted for a 2-yard setback. South Plantation won the game against Piper High School 41–12. On October 11, 2012, DiMeglio was crowned homecoming queen. In 2013, she received a $20,000 scholarship from Foot Locker's Scholar Athlete Program and DoSomething.org.

Her father Tom, taught her to throw a football as a child, and in the fourth grade, she joined a flag football league where all the players but four were boys. When she was in high school, DiMeglio became quarterback of the girls' flag football team, before joining the boys' football team. Her family and friends are always supporting her sports by going to games and volunteering at the concession stand. Both parents, Kathleen and Tom rarely miss a sporting event.

In fall 2013, Erin enrolled to the University of Central Florida, joining her older sister, Amy. As a sophomore during the 2013–2014 academic year, Erin wanted to redshirt in football and walk on to the women's basketball team during the 2014 season, but did not make the team.

As of May 2020, DiMeglio is working as a firefighter and EMT in Davie, Florida.
