= Mpanjaka betschi =

Scientific classification
- Domain: Eukaryota
- Kingdom: Animalia
- Phylum: Arthropoda
- Class: Insecta
- Order: Lepidoptera
- Superfamily: Noctuoidea
- Family: Erebidae
- Genus: Mpanjaka
- Species: M. betschi

Binomial name
- Mpanjaka betschi (Griveaud, 1974)

Synonyms
- Dasychira betschi (Griveaud, 1974)

Species of moth

Mpanjaka betschi is a moth of the family Erebidae first described by Paul Griveaud in 1974. It is found in central Madagascar.

It has a wingspan of 34 mm and the length of the forewings is 16 mm.

== See also ==
- List of moths of Madagascar
