= Reggie Cross =

American basketball player (born 1966)

Personal information
- Born: August 12, 1966 (age 60) Fort Lauderdale, Florida, U.S.
- Listed height: 6 ft 8 in (2.03 m)
- Listed weight: 245 lb (111 kg)

Career information
- High school: South Plantation (Plantation, Florida)
- College: Miami Dade (1984–1986); Hawaii (1987–1989)
- NBA draft: 1989: 2nd round, 44th overall pick
- Drafted by: Philadelphia 76ers
- Playing career: 1989–1996
- Position: Power forward / center

Career history
- 1989–1990: Hapoel Haifa
- 1990: Grand Rapids Hoops
- 1990: Yakima Sun Kings
- 1990–1991: Grupo IFA Granollers
- 1991–1992: Le Mans Sarthe
- 1992: Palm Beach Stingrays
- 1992: Montreal Dragons
- 1992: Columbus Horizon
- 1993: Winnipeg Thunder
- 1993–1994: Yıldırımspor
- 1994–1995: Efes Pilsen
- 1995–1996: Oyak Renault

Career highlights
- First-team All-WAC (1989)
- Stats at Basketball Reference

Reginald Gene Cross (born August 12, 1966) is an American former professional basketball player. He played college basketball with the Miami Dade Sharks and the Hawaii Rainbow Warriors. Cross was selected in the 1987 NBA draft by the Philadelphia 76ers but never played in the National Basketball Association (NBA). He instead played professionally in the American Continental Basketball Association (CBA) and in France, Spain and Turkey. Cross is the most recent player from the Hawaii Rainbow Warriors to be selected in an NBA draft.

== College career ==
Cross emerged as a promising prospect while playing at South Plantation High School in Plantation, Florida, and received multiple scholarship offers from NCAA Division I colleges. However, he was not initially academically eligible and instead played his first two seasons of college basketball with the Miami Dade Sharks. During his sophomore season, he was selected to the All-State Team and named by Basketball Weekly as being among the top junior college transfer candidates. In 1986, Cross was offered a scholarship by the University of Hawaii at Manoa, who had first attempted to recruit him during his high school career. He was required to spend the 1986–87 season at Leeward Community College while not playing basketball to become academically eligible for Hawaii. Cross financially supported himself while taking classes by working full-time as a courier for a legal firm.

Cross made his debut for the Hawaii Rainbow Warriors during the 1987–88 season, and averaged 15.7 points per game. During his senior season in 1988–89, Cross led Hawaii to its first postseason bid since 1974 while averaging 18.6 points per game. Cross was subsequently selected to the All-WAC First Team, while he was named as Hawaii's most outstanding player during both of his seasons with the team. He gained further attention from NBA teams following a promising showing at an All-Star Game in Japan and earned invites to multiple NBA tryout camps.

== Professional career ==
Cross was selected in the 1989 NBA draft by the Philadelphia 76ers as the 44th overall pick. He was waived by the 76ers on October 19, 1989. On December 2, 1989, Cross signed with Hapoel Haifa in Israel to join the team until April 1990. Cross joined the Orlando Magic for training camp in 1990 but did not make the team's final roster. He spent part of the 1990–91 season playing in Spain with the Grupo IFA Granollers, replacing Tom Sheehey. Cross spent the remaining 1990–91 season in the Continental Basketball Association (CBA), splitting his season between the Grand Rapids Hoops and the Yakima Sun Kings.

After a stint in France playing for Le Mans Sarthe during the 1991–92 season, Cross returned to the United States in 1992 to play for the Palm Beach Stingrays of the United States Basketball League (USBL) and the Columbus Horizon of the CBA. Following the conclusion of the CBA season, he joined the Washington Bullets for training camp but missed time with the team due to an illness in his family. In June 1993 he played for the Winnipeg Thunder of the Canadian National Basketball League after having been part of the Montreal Dragons roster. He spent three consecutive seasons playing in Turkey from 1993 to 1996.

== Career statistics ==
Legend
GP	Games played	GS	Games started	MPG	Minutes per game
FG%	Field goal percentage	3P%	3-point field goal percentage	FT%	Free throw percentage
RPG	Rebounds per game	APG	Assists per game	SPG	Steals per game
BPG	Blocks per game	PPG	Points per game	**Bold**	Career high

=== College ===
Year	Team	GP	GS	MPG	FG%	3P%	FT%	RPG	APG	SPG	BPG	PPG
1987–88	Hawaii	29	–	**33.9**	.477	**.500**	.730	**8.6**	**1.1**	1.1	.2	15.7
1988–89	Hawaii	**30**	–	33.6	**.529**	–	**.767**	8.1	1.0	**1.4**	**.6**	**18.6**
Career		59	–	33.7	.506	.500	.749	8.3	1.0	1.3	.4	17.2

== Personal life ==
Cross' first child, a daughter, was born while he was attending Miami Dade. He married the child's mother, Gwenell, in 1986. His second child, a son, was born during his first season at Hawaii.
