= Iain Donald Campbell =

Scottish biophysicist and biochemist (1941–2014)

Iain Campbell FRS
- Born: Iain Donald Campbell; 24 April 1941; Perth, Scotland
- Died: 5 March 2014 (aged 72); England
- Education: Perth Academy; University of St Andrews (BSc, PhD)
- Known for: Nuclear Magnetic Resonance
- Spouse: Karin C. Wehle (m. 1967)
- Awards: Croonian Lecture; EMBO Member
- Scientific career
- Fields: Biophysics; Biochemistry
- Workplaces: University of Bradford; University of Oxford
- Thesis: An electron spin resonance study of optically excited states (1967)
- Notable students: Annalisa Pastore (postdoc)
- Website: www.bioch.ox.ac.uk/about/archives2014/professor-iain-campbell

Iain Donald Campbell FRS (24 April 1941 – 5 March 2014) was a Scottish biophysicist and academic. He was Professor of Structural Biology at the University of Oxford from 1992 to 2009.

== Early life and education ==
Campbell was born on 24 April 1941 in Blackford, Perth and Kinross, Scotland. He was the son of Daniel Campbell and Catherine Campbell (née Lauder). He was educated at Perth Academy, a state school in Perth. He went on to study physics at the University of St Andrews, graduating in 1963. He remained at St Andrews to undertake post-graduate research and completed his Doctor of Philosophy (PhD) degree in physics. His doctoral advisor was Dirk Bijl, and he undertook research under John F. Allen.

== Career and research ==
Campbell worked briefly at the University of Bradford before moving to the Physical and Theoretical Chemistry Laboratory at the University of Oxford in South Parks Road, Oxford, in 1967, to work with the chemist Sir Rex Richards. He was appointed a Fellow of St John's College, Oxford in 1987 and Emeritus Research Fellow in 2009.

=== Awards and honours ===
Campbell was elected a Fellow of the Royal Society (FRS) in 1995. He was elected a member of the European Molecular Biology Organisation (EMBO). He was awarded the Croonian Lecture by the Royal Society in 2006 and received honorary degrees from the University of Lund, University of Portsmouth and University of St Andrews.

== Personal life ==
Campbell married Karin Wehle in 1967. They had two daughters and a son. The family lived in Summertown, Oxford. Campbell died of bone cancer.
