= Magliano, Torricella Sicura =

Village in Torricella Sicura, Abruzzo, Italy

Coordinates: 42°40′37″N 13°34′19″E

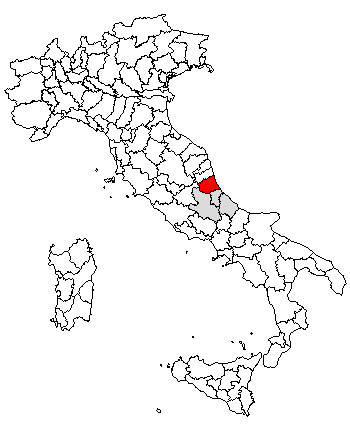
Location of the province of Teramo

Magliano is a village in the Italian region of Abruzzo. It is a frazione of the comune of Torricella Sicura, in the Province of Teramo.

== Geography ==
At the time of a 1981 census, Magliano consisted of only 13 families living in 11 residences and had a population of 35 including 18 males and 17 females. Eleven homes (consisting of 42 rooms) were occupied and fourteen homes (consisting of 41 rooms) were empty.

== Bibliography ==
- Giammario Sgattoni, L'Abruzzo antico, Lanciano, Carabba, 1979, p. 149. {It}
- Gabriele Di Cesare, Torricella Sicura. Lineamenti storici, Eco editrice, Isola del G. Sasso (Te), 1989, pp. 16, 116-118.
- Paesi abbandonati: contributo al recupero del patrimonio edilizio dei Monti della Laga, a cura di Giovanni Di Marco, Lucio Di Blasio, Sabatino Fratini, Associazione Gandhi, EGI, Teramo, Edigrafital, 1991, pp. 108–111.
- Teramo e la Valle del Tordino, Teramo, Fondazione Cassa di Risparmio della Provincia di Teramo, 2006, (Documenti dell’Abruzzo teramano, 7, collana diretta da Luisa Franchi dell’Orto), vol. VII-1, pp. 50, 192 e vol. VII-2, p. 695.
