= Mpanjaka montana =

Scientific classification
- Domain: Eukaryota
- Kingdom: Animalia
- Phylum: Arthropoda
- Class: Insecta
- Order: Lepidoptera
- Superfamily: Noctuoidea
- Family: Erebidae
- Genus: Mpanjaka
- Species: M. montana

Binomial name
- Mpanjaka montana (Griveaud, 1974)

Synonyms
- Dasychira montana (Griveaud, 1974)

Species of moth

Mpanjaka montana is a moth of the family Erebidae first described by Paul Griveaud in 1974. It is found in central Madagascar.

The male has a wingspan of 57 mm and the length of the forewings is 28 mm. Abdomen, thorax and head are uniformly beige. Antennae are bipectinate (comb like on both sides). Forewings are white with a dense pattern of black scales and three lines of red spots crossing the wing. Hindwings are yellowish white.

== See also ==
- List of moths of Madagascar
