= Il re pastore (disambiguation) =

Il re pastore is a 1775 opera by Wolfgang Amadeus Mozart.

Il re pastore may also refer to:

- Il re pastore (libretto), 1751 libretto by Pietro Metastasio for these and many more operas
- Il re pastore (Gluck), 1756 opera by Christoph Willibald Gluck
- Il re pastore (Piccinni), 1760 opera by Niccolò Piccinni

== See also ==
- Pastore (disambiguation)
