= Mpanjaka grandidieri =

Scientific classification
- Domain: Eukaryota
- Kingdom: Animalia
- Phylum: Arthropoda
- Class: Insecta
- Order: Lepidoptera
- Superfamily: Noctuoidea
- Family: Erebidae
- Genus: Mpanjaka
- Species: M. grandidieri

Binomial name
- Mpanjaka grandidieri (Butler, 1882)

Synonyms
- Calliteara grandidieri Butler, 1882

Species of moth

Mpanjaka grandidieri is a moth of the family Erebidae first described by Arthur Gardiner Butler in 1882. It is found in central Madagascar.

The wings are mouse grey, sparkled with black dots and crossed by four zigzag white stripes. The body is whitish brown and sandy reddish behind the collar. The abdomen with blackish dorsal spots. The antennae are white, black speckled with dark-brown pectinations.

The male has a wingspan of 53 mm. This species was described by a specimen from Ankafana, central Madagascar.

== See also ==
- List of moths of Madagascar
