= Alfredo Roberts =

American football player and coach (born 1965)

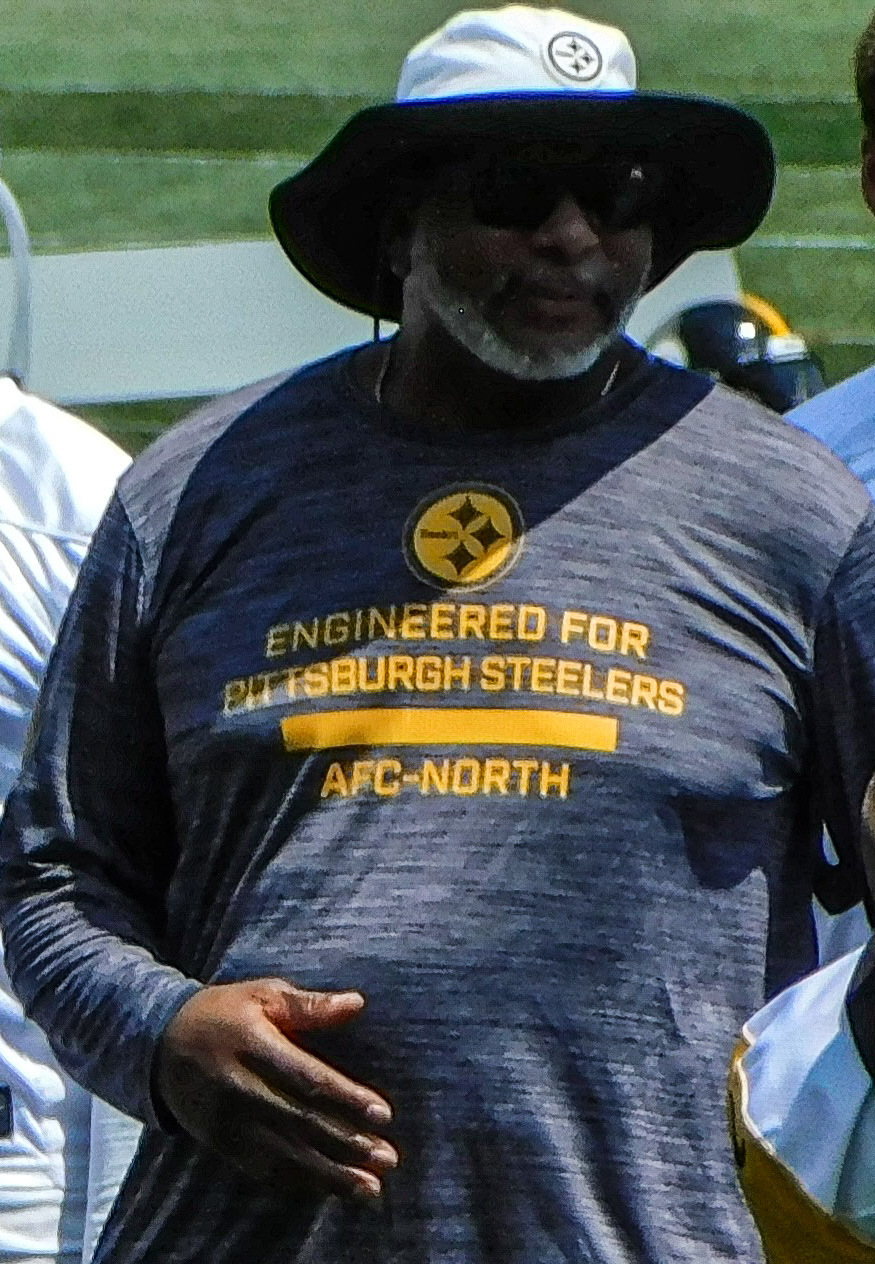
- Roberts with the Pittsburgh Steelers in 2025

New York Jets
- Title: Tight ends coach

Personal information
- Born: March 17, 1965 (age 61); Fort Lauderdale, Florida, U.S.
- Listed height: 6 ft 3 in (1.91 m)
- Listed weight: 250 lb (113 kg)

Career information
- Position: Tight end (No. 87)
- High school: South Plantation (Plantation, Florida)
- College: Miami (FL)
- NFL draft: 1988: 8th round, 197th overall pick

Career history

Playing
- Kansas City Chiefs (1988–1990); Dallas Cowboys (1991–1993)

Coaching
- Florida Atlantic (1999–2000) Running backs coach; Florida Atlantic (2001–2002) Wide receivers coach; Jacksonville Jaguars (2003–2006) Tight ends coach; Cleveland Browns (2007–2008) Tight ends coach; Tampa Bay Buccaneers (2009–2011) Tight ends coach; Indianapolis Colts (2012–2015) Tight ends coach; Carmel High School (Indiana) (2016) Tight ends coach; Los Angeles Chargers (2017–2019) Running backs coach; Los Angeles Chargers (2020) Tight ends coach; Pittsburgh Steelers (2021–2025) Tight ends coach; New York Jets (2026–present) Tight ends coach

Awards and highlights
- 2× Super Bowl champion (XXVII, XXVIII); 2× National champion (1983, 1987)

Career NFL statistics
- Receptions: 48
- Receiving yards: 450
- Receiving touchdowns: 2
- Stats at Pro Football Reference

Alfredo Roberts (born March 17, 1965) is an American football coach and former tight end in the National Football League (NFL), who serves as the tight ends coach for the New York Jets. He played for the Kansas City Chiefs and Dallas Cowboys. He played college football for the Miami Hurricanes.

== Early life ==
Roberts attended South Plantation High School. As a senior tight end, he received All-city and second-team All-state honors. He helped his team win 2 consecutive city championships.

In baseball, he was a second-team All-state catcher/first baseman as a senior. He led his team in hitting in two of his three seasons.

== College career ==
Roberts accepted a football scholarship from the University of Miami. In 1983, he was redshirted, when head coach Howard Schnellenberger led the team to a National Championship.

As a freshman, he was a backup tight end behind Willie Smith. The next year, he was a third-string tight end, after being passed on the depth chart by Charles Henry.

As a junior, he was used as a backup blocking tight end behind Henry, increasing his receiving production to 10 receptions for 105 yards and 2 touchdowns.

As a senior in 1987, he shared the starting position with Henry, making 13 receptions for 137 yards and one touchdown, as part of a 12-0 undefeated team, that won the National Championship under head coach Jimmy Johnson.

He finished his career with 29 receptions for 296 yards and 4 touchdowns, while playing on 3 bowl teams (two Fiesta Bowls, one Sugar Bowl and one Orange Bowl).

== Professional career ==
Pre-draft measurables
Height	Weight	Hand span	40-yard dash	10-yard split	20-yard split	20-yard shuttle	Vertical jump
6 ft 3 3/4 in (1.92 m)	247 lb (112 kg)	8 3/4 in (0.22 m)	4.95 s	1.71 s	2.84 s	4.46 s	29.5 in (0.75 m)
All values from NFL Combine

=== Kansas City Chiefs ===
Roberts was selected by the Kansas City Chiefs in the eighth-round (197th overall) of the 1988 NFL draft. As a rookie, he started the first 7 games, before being limited with a shoulder injury that required arthroscopic surgery in the offseason. He was replaced in the starting lineupe with Jonathan Hayes.

In 1989, he was a backup behind Hayes, making 8 receptions for 55 yards and one touchdown. In 1990, he started 13 games, posting 11 receptions for 119 yards

=== Dallas Cowboys ===
On March 18, 1991, he was signed in Plan B free agency by the Dallas Cowboys, reuniting with his former University of Miami head coach Jimmy Johnson. He was used as a blocking tight end behind Jay Novacek, helping Emmitt Smith lead the league with 365 carries for 1,563 rushing yards.

In 1992, he contributed to Smith leading the league with 1,713 rushing yards and 18 rushing touchdowns. He missed the playoffs because of a right knee injury he suffered in the season finale against the Chicago Bears and was not a part of Super Bowl XXVII. He was replaced with Derek Tennell.

In 1993, he was placed on the injured reserve list after fracturing his foot during a training camp passing drill against the Los Angeles Raiders. He was eventually replaced with Scott Galbraith. On March 31, 1994, he was released after not being able to recover from his previous foot injury.

== Coaching career ==
Roberts transitioned to coaching ahead of the 1999 NCAA season when he was hired by Florida Atlantic University to serve as their running backs coach. He then transitioned into the school's wide receivers coach for the 2001 and 2002 seasons.

In 2003, he was hired by his first NFL team, becoming the tight ends coach for the Jacksonville Jaguars for four seasons. Between 2007 and 2015, he was a tight ends coach for three different teams (Cleveland Browns, Tampa Bay Buccaneers, Indianapolis Colts). He continued to coach at Carmel High School before returning to the NFL to coach with the Los Angeles Chargers from 2017 until 2020.

On January 25, 2021, Roberts was hired by the Pittsburgh Steelers, where he served as the team's tight ends coach through 2025.

On February 10, 2026, the New York Jets hired Roberts as their tight ends coach under offensive coordinator Frank Reich.
