= Eurycallinus mirabilis =

Scientific classification
- Domain: Eukaryota
- Kingdom: Animalia
- Phylum: Arthropoda
- Class: Insecta
- Order: Coleoptera
- Suborder: Polyphaga
- Infraorder: Cucujiformia
- Family: Cerambycidae
- Genus: Eurycallinus
- Species: E. mirabilis

Binomial name
- Eurycallinus mirabilis Bates, 1885

Species of beetle

Eurycallinus mirabilis is a species of Longhorn beetle described by Henry Walter Bates in 1885.
