= Tuberopeplus krahmeri =

Scientific classification
- Kingdom: Animalia
- Phylum: Arthropoda
- Class: Insecta
- Order: Coleoptera
- Suborder: Polyphaga
- Infraorder: Cucujiformia
- Family: Cerambycidae
- Genus: Tuberopeplus
- Species: T. krahmeri

Binomial name
- Tuberopeplus krahmeri Cerda, 1980

Species of beetle

Tuberopeplus krahmeri is a species of beetle in the family Cerambycidae. It was described by Cerda in 1980. It is known from Chile.
