= Mpanjaka albovirida =

Scientific classification
- Kingdom: Animalia
- Phylum: Arthropoda
- Clade: Pancrustacea
- Class: Insecta
- Order: Lepidoptera
- Superfamily: Noctuoidea
- Family: Erebidae
- Genus: Mpanjaka
- Species: M. albovirida

Binomial name
- Mpanjaka albovirida (Griveaud, 1970)

Synonyms
- Laelia albovirida (Griveaud, 1970)

Species of moth

Mpanjaka albovirida is a moth of the family of Erebidae that is found in North Madagascar.

The male has a wingspan of 27–34 mm and the length of the frontwings is 13 to 15mm.
