= Brachychilus literatus =

Scientific classification
- Kingdom: Animalia
- Phylum: Arthropoda
- Class: Insecta
- Order: Coleoptera
- Suborder: Polyphaga
- Infraorder: Cucujiformia
- Family: Cerambycidae
- Genus: Brachychilus
- Species: B. literatus

Binomial name
- Brachychilus literatus Blanchard in Gay, 1851

Synonyms
- Brachychilus lituratus Blanchard, 1851; Brachychilus lituratus m. modestus Breuning, 1963; Brachychilus modestus Philippi F. & Philippi R., 1864

Species of beetle

Brachychilus literatus is a species of beetle in the family Cerambycidae. It was described by Blanchard in 1851. It is known from Chile.
