= Eurycallinus unifasciatus =

Scientific classification
- Kingdom: Animalia
- Phylum: Arthropoda
- Class: Insecta
- Order: Coleoptera
- Suborder: Polyphaga
- Infraorder: Cucujiformia
- Family: Cerambycidae
- Genus: Eurycallinus
- Species: E. unifasciatus

Binomial name
- Eurycallinus unifasciatus (Breuning, 1947)

Species of beetle

Eurycallinus unifasciatus is a species of beetle in the family Cerambycidae. It was described by Stephan von Breuning in 1947. It is known from Mexico.
