= Eurycallinus =

Scientific classification
- Domain: Eukaryota
- Kingdom: Animalia
- Phylum: Arthropoda
- Class: Insecta
- Order: Coleoptera
- Suborder: Polyphaga
- Infraorder: Cucujiformia
- Family: Cerambycidae
- Tribe: Phacellini
- Genus: Eurycallinus

Genus of beetles

Eurycallinus is a genus of longhorn beetles of the subfamily Lamiinae, containing the following species:

- Eurycallinus mirabilis Bates, 1885
- Eurycallinus unifasciatus (Breuning, 1947)
