= Giovanni Conti (painter) =

Italian painter

Giovanni Conti (died April 9, 1909) was an Italian painter, mainly of sacred subjects.

He was a pupil of Luigi Pastore in Aversa. He painted Trumpet of the Last Judgement, (1865), Resurrection of Lazarus (1869), and Death of Abel (1869). He participated in Neapolitan Promotrice exhibitions.
