= Costumi =

Hamlet in the Province of Teramo, Italy

Coordinates: 42°39′54″N 13°38′13″E

Costumi is a frazione (a hamlet) in the commune of Torricella Sicura in the Italian province of Teramo.

The census of 25 October 1981 found 131 residents, 63 male and 68 female, in 38 homes.
