= Mpanjaka elegans =

Scientific classification
- Domain: Eukaryota
- Kingdom: Animalia
- Phylum: Arthropoda
- Class: Insecta
- Order: Lepidoptera
- Superfamily: Noctuoidea
- Family: Erebidae
- Genus: Mpanjaka
- Species: M. elegans

Binomial name
- Mpanjaka elegans (Butler, 1882)

Synonyms
- Calliteara elegans Butler, 1882

Species of moth

Mpanjaka elegans is a moth of the family Erebidae first described by Arthur Gardiner Butler in 1882. It is found in central Madagascar.

The wings are white, speckled with black scales, particularly upon the basal third that is limited by a brown stripe. It wears a zigzagged pale black post-median line. The head is whity-brown and the palpi black. The antennae are white, black speckles with brown pectinations.

The male of this species has a wingspan of 51 mm. It was described by a specimen from Ankafana, central Madagascar.

== See also ==
- List of moths of Madagascar
