= Tuberopeplus =

Scientific classification
- Kingdom: Animalia
- Phylum: Arthropoda
- Class: Insecta
- Order: Coleoptera
- Suborder: Polyphaga
- Infraorder: Cucujiformia
- Family: Cerambycidae
- Subfamily: Lamiinae
- Tribe: Phacellini
- Genus: Tuberopeplus; Breuning, 1948

Genus of beetles

Tuberopeplus is a genus of longhorn beetles of the subfamily Lamiinae, containing the following species:

- Tuberopeplus chilensis Breuning, 1947
- Tuberopeplus krahmeri Cerda, 1980
