= Tuberopeplus chilensis =

Scientific classification
- Kingdom: Animalia
- Phylum: Arthropoda
- Class: Insecta
- Order: Coleoptera
- Suborder: Polyphaga
- Infraorder: Cucujiformia
- Family: Cerambycidae
- Genus: Tuberopeplus
- Species: T. chilensis

Binomial name
- Tuberopeplus chilensis Breuning, 1947

Synonyms
- Laraesima chilensis Breuning, 1980; Penessada chilensis Peňa, 1960

Species of beetle

Tuberopeplus chilensis is a species of beetle in the family Cerambycidae. It was described by Stephan von Breuning in 1947. It is known from Chile.
