= Valle Piola =

Coordinates: 42.698595°N 13.57712°E

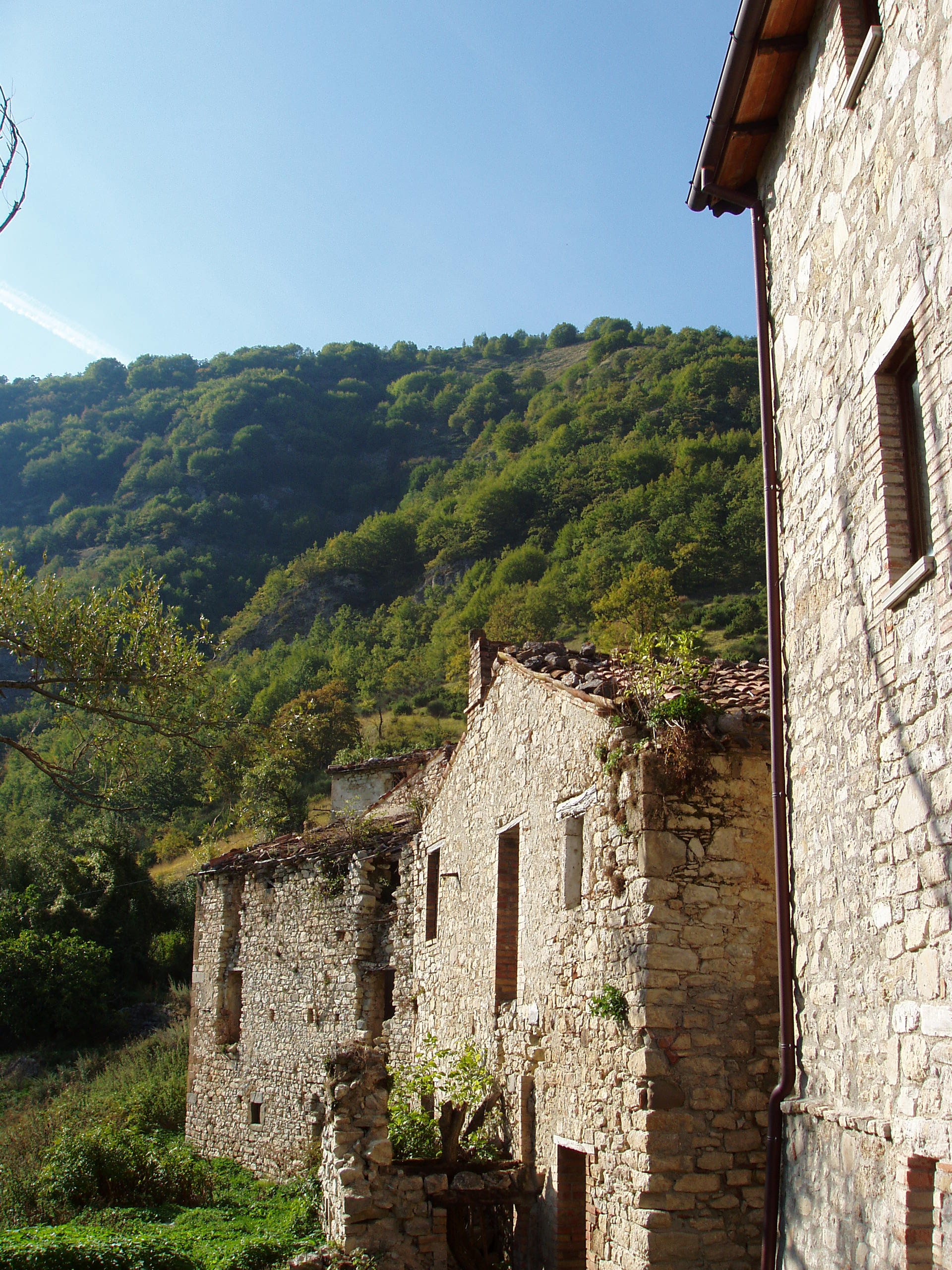
Valle Piola was abandoned in 1977.

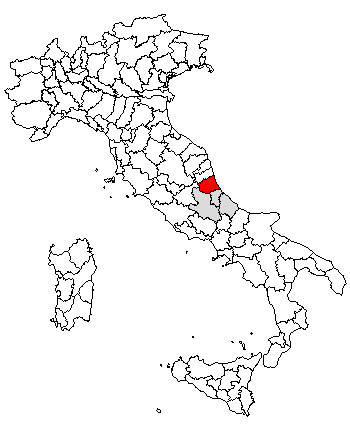
Location of Teramo in Italy

Valle Piola is a deserted village in the province of Teramo, in the Abruzzo region of central Italy. It is a frazione of the comune of Torricella Sicura. Having been abandoned in 1977, all that remains are 9 abandoned houses, a church, and the ruins of a shepherds' shelter. The village has recently received renewed interest from the Gran Sasso and Monti della Laga National Park authorities with the aim of restoring and revitalizing the village and its environs.

== Geography ==
Valle Piola is located in a national park district known as “Tra due Regni” (Between Two Kingdoms), in an area known as Monti della Laga. The village sits at an elevation of approximately 3336 feet on the northeast slope of Monte Farina, a natural basin from which springs the Rio Valle, a tributary of the Vezzola River. Valle Piola is reachable from Teramo by means of a gravel road. The main, and only, street in the village center has been paved. A mule path leads to higher elevations.

== History ==
Perhaps the first written document mentioning Valle Piola dates back to the year 1059. Early records show that the area surrounding Valle Piola, along with the adjoining lands of Monti della Laga enjoyed a semi-autonomous status. Such rights have been codified in the form of statutes bestowing upon Valle Piola the recognition of being a "rural comune" (rural commune).

In the years following 1152 the mountain areas of the region lost population as people made their way to the much larger provincial capital of Teramo. These migrations were at times involuntary in nature. One well known family from Teramo, the De Valles, likely originated from Valle Piola, possibly from Case Menghini.

Because of its isolated nature, the people of Valle Piola were by necessity very self-sufficient. Since it took several long hours by foot or mule to reach the nearest good sized town, Teramo, they also had to be well organized and prepared for the hardships they faced, especially those encountered in the long, cold winter months. Virtually every house in the village had an adjacent animal stall which used to shelter the family cows, steers, pigs, and horses. Also present was a small garden for the cultivation of potatoes and other vegetables. Stone walls, now completely in ruins, at one time helped to form terraces on the hilly slopes surrounding the houses.

Many of the people from Valle Piola were illiterate and spoke a Lombardic dialect which was virtually incomprehensible to residents of the neighboring villages. Historically, the most educated and cultured resident was the local priest. More recently, the school master would also have fit this description.

From the 13th century until the time of the Italian Risorgimento (unification), Valle Piola served as a meeting center and hideout for armed brigands who made this area their home, this area being ideally suited for such purposes. These groups demanded total loyalty to their cause thus leading both to squabbles amongst the various brigand factions as well as to clashes with the sovereign forces whose task was to uphold the law. They encountered at best mixed success in their attempts to subdue and pacify the openly rebellious subversive outlaw clans. At times these internecine battles took on characteristics of a civil war.

During the Second World War the Italian resistance fighters staged in this area, along with Bosco Martese and other nearby forest tracts of Monti della Laga in their struggles against the occupying German forces.

In present times the area surrounding Valle Piola is used mainly for the grazing of livestock. In the summer months a herdsman watches over the animals day and night and a shelter for protection from the elements has recently been constructed.

== Architectural highlights ==
The oldest part of Valle Piola is in the shape of a horseshoe and in later times additional houses were built nearby. A lightwell placed in one of the city's walls once provided greatly appreciated illumination to open areas below. What is left of this structure now stands in ruins for the most part covered by rocky soil and other debris. It is said the damage resulted from the rupture of an underground well structure. Also located in the center part of the village are two porticoes through which passes the main street of the town. On one portico is a keystone which once likely boasted a sculpture in the form a human face. Its disappearance is likely the result of scavengers looking for valued architectural relics of more prosperous times. Between two porticoes is an open and expansive piazza.

A mill once stood next to the bridge built on the road of Valle Piola, Via della Fauna. The economy was strongly connected to the timber industry with Valle Piola known both for charcoal manufacture which was carried to Teramo via mules, as well as the manufacture of lumber for construction. A small quarry yielded limestone which was then baked so it could be used to produce cement products.

== Suburb Case Menghini (Menghini Family Homes) ==
This location consists of a small cluster of interconnected homes belonging to several owners. In past years the wealthy Menghini family occupied what was then one large structure. Attesting to its significance are the presence of protected niches that could be used by armed guardsmen to protect the dwelling from brigand attacks. Several grand reception rooms contain very large fireplaces. Adjoining buildings are smaller in dimension and contain sleeping and other living quarters.

== I gafii (wooden balconies) ==
Two of the structures in Valle Piola have attached to them a wooden balcony known as a gafio. One is the house of the Menghini family located on the town outskirts. A second is found in the old town center. This second house once served as a stable and was recently restored by two individuals from Torricella Sicura, the carpenter Offredo Polidori, and his son Mario.

The gafio balconies serve as vestiges of Valle Piola's ancient connections with northern Lombardic peoples. The term gafio ("lu gafie" in the local Abruzzese dialect) comes from the Lombardic word "waifa", meaning "space which is non private." These covered wooden balconies constituted precisely such areas. A close examination of the gafio balconies speaks to the highly developed craftsmanship of the Abruzzese and Lombardic tradesmen while working with wooden materials. The gafio balconies are unique in that they are able to support the weight of floorboards, one or more human occupants and, in the cold winter months, snow on the protective covering above. It is difficult to imagine how any material besides wood could be better suited to the construction of these protruding dwelling structures.

== Streets ==
Records show that Valle Piola has always had but one street, Via della Fauna, which leads to the nearby village of Poggio Valle. Smaller paths, including a mule trail, have connected Valle Piola with Acquaratola (a hike of approximately 40 minutes by foot), the town cemetery, and Case Menghini. In the past, a carriageway provided a shortcut from Case Menghini to the Valle Piola cemetery. Frequently, heavy mountain rains made Via della Fauna impassable. In the 1950s a rudimentary bridge was constructed over the Rio de Valle thereby, largely eliminating the effects of this bothersome natural event.

== Water springs ==
Owing to the presence of one of the few available water fountains, Valle Piola's early development centered around Case Menghini and the village cemetery. The design and installation of an aqueduct carrying mountain spring water brought several changes. Two fountains were constructed, one at Case Menghini and the second in front of the church in Valle Piola. From this point onward Case Menghini lost population and Valle Piola increased in importance.

== Churches ==
There are three churches in the area. The one in center Valle Piola is called San Nicola. The remaining churches are at Case Menghini and in a location adjacent to the cemetery.

== Utilities ==
The town of Valle Piola and nearby Case Menghini were connected to the local electrical grid in 1955. Telephone lines first arrived in 1965 at the house of the Ferrante family who a while thereafter moved away from the village. This telephone connection was then transferred to one of the newer houses a short distance away.

== Denizens ==
Inhabits of the town included members of the Bianchini, Cornacchia, Pace and Volpi families. Two separate branches of Ferrantes also lived here. The Menghini family at one time owned several large tracts of land. The specific reason for their departure is not known although it is likely that they left voluntarily to seek their fortunes elsewhere. It has been said that the Menghinis were paid the princely sum 18,000 Lire for their holdings prior to leaving.

== Folk legends ==
The sighting of apparitions has been reported in the area. Some of the locals believe that many powerful spirits, both evil and benign, still remain and make themselves known only in the dark shadows of the night.

== The ancient life ==
During the 1940s, for professional reasons, the teacher and journalist Fernando Aurini spent time in Valle Piola. To the wonderment of his readers living in the grand cities of Italy, Aurini vividly recounted the rustic ways, lifestyles, and long forgotten archaic traditions of this small village. Aurini's writings highlight the fact that the journey to Teramo via Campli on foot or with a mule took the better part of four hours. To the present this path by foot requires a difficult hike across Monte Natale in an area known as Pietra Stretta. The trial begins with an easy incline and soon enters a mound of trees and tangled undergrowth so thick that it requires the frequent surveillance and clearing by the local park employees and woodsmen. One then encounters a steep upward slope to the mountain summit resulting in a panoramic view of the valley below. In the early morning hours one can see the sun's rays illuminating nearby Monte della Farina with Valle Piola at its base.

== Depopulation ==
In the late 1950s, as people left Valle Piola to live in larger communities or to seek a less rural lifestyle, the town began to experience the effects of significant population decrease. This process continued unabated and by the 1970s the few remaining elderly townspeople were forced to leave altogether what had become a virtually abandoned village. Like the abandoned mining camps in the American west, those visiting Valle Piola encounter the ruins of a deserted but not totally forgotten hinterland. Memories of the taste and smell of traditional artisan foods made with the grain farro (spelt), the squeals of children's laughter as they played a game of chance, aliossi (the forerunner of today's dice games) await the traveler fortunate enough to visit this isolated and sparsely populated area.

== Prospects for the future ==
In recent years Valle Piola has been the object of attention from the Gran Sasso e Monti della Laga National Park authorities who are looking for ways to restore and revitalize the area. The plans for this project were presented to the public at a festival known as "Festa di Fine Estate" (Summer's End Festival). Included in this undertaking is the construction of a hotel incorporating as many of the remaining buildings as possible. A model for these efforts is the nearby town of Santo Stefano di Sessanio which has successfully preserved the atmosphere and architectural integrity of a centuries old Italian mountain village. Alternatively, the village may end up on the property market as there are recent reports suggesting that a guide price of half a million euros is being sought.

== Notes and references ==
- Fabio Vallarola, Il paese di Valle Piola, in: Fabio Vallarola, Il Gran Sasso e Monti della Laga, il Parco Nazionale, Mosciano Sant'Angelo (Te), Media edizioni, 1998, pp. 147–192. (in Italian)
- Lucio De Marcellis (Ed.), Fernando Aurini, Memorie d'Abruzzo, Teramo, Edigrafital, 2006, pp. 119, 124, 147, 223. Fernando Aurini's direct observations and comments concerning the traditions and lifestyles of the citizens of Valle Piola during the 1940s (in Italian)
