= Felice Pastore =

Italian nobleman

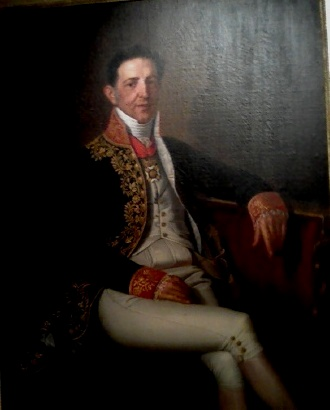
Felice Pastore

Felice Pastore (5 August 1786 – 9 May 1862) was an Italian nobleman.

== Biography ==
Felice Pastore Cambon, baron of Rincione Monreale, was born in Palermo to Don Nicolò and Donna Anna Combon. This Sicilian feudal title was created by the King of Sicily, Francesco I for Nicolò Pastore (Felice's father), who was assigned some manor farms and the feuds in the region of Monreale including Rincione, Angimbè, Fico and Scalilla.

In 1809, Felice Pastore married Donna Stefania Naselli Montaperto from the princes of Raffadali and the sister of the archbishop of Palermo (from 1853 to 1870), Giovan Battista Naselli. He was an adopted citizen of Alcamo, as he spent most of his life in Alcamo; he also was a member of various agricultural colleges, and thanks to his discoveries and the results of his work, he received a few prizes at the Esposizione Nazionale of Palermo and Florence: he studied mathematics, physics and letters and, owing to his studies in agriculture, he greatly improved the production of oils and wines in his lands, by inserting the cultivation of morus.

He was a protagonist of the Sicilian political scene in the 19th century; his name is linked to the movement of Reformism. He was very good-tempered, but strong and decisive too: for this reason, he had different and important offices. In 1815 he made a long trip together with his wife and described the encounters and impressions in a Diary which is an important literary testimony of that period because it refers to interesting information about the history of customs and folklore from 1811 until 1862, collected in 21 volumes.

He distinguished himself, above all, for his charities, among which the foundation of the institution Pia Opera Pastore; in 1837, during the period of cholera, every day he gave the sum of 800 liras to the Parson for the sufferer and in 1848 he gave a lot of help to the escapees from Messina.

He died in 1862 in Palermo: his wife, Donna Stefania Naselli di Montaperto, had her husband's corpse carried to Alcamo at Church of Saint Mary of Jesus. Later, in 1880, it was buried in the chapel of Pia Opera Pastore, the institute that had been founded by his will in 1860.

He left a great estate for this institution: it was realised in order to give a moral formation, a civic and religious education to the female youth.

=== Appointments and offices ===
- Baron of Rincione, since 1 May 1809
- Senator in Palermo in 1813
- Prefect of Trapani (1818–1820)
- Prefect of Palermo (1821): appointment refused by Pastore.
- Councillor of the Royal Domains beyond the lighthouse (1824 and 1849)
- Commander (order) of the Royal Order of Francesco I (1829).
- Lower court magistrate of Palermo (1849).
- Member of various economic institutions.
- Patron and councillor of several charities.
- Promoting member of the "Society of acclimatization and agriculture".

=== Diaries ===
Diaries from 1827 to 1829 are missing. Surviving diaries include:

- 1. Notes concerning baptisms, confirmations, weddings and deaths.
- 2. Notes on rites and customs, churches and religious festivities.
- 3. Notes on di gastronomy.
- 4. Notes on empirical medicine.
- 5. Notes on animals and empirical veterinary medicine.
- 6. Notes on agrarian cultivations (and methods of cultivation). Notes of Oenology.
- 7. Notes on means of transport and locomotion.
- 8. Notes on popular beliefs.
- 9. Notes on a trade fair (no longer existing).
- 10. Notes on games of bocce and billiards.
- 11. Notes on traditional uses of sales and contracts.
- 12. Notes on operators of trades, now missing.

== Sources ==
- Palmeri, Placido: Elogio funebre del barone Felice Pastore Cambon / letto nella Chiesa dei Padri Crociferi addi 14 maggio 1862 giorno dei funerali dal P. D. Placido Palmeri
- Carlo Cataldo: La Casa del Sole p. 141-160; Alcamo ed.campo, 1999
- Dott. A. Mango di Casalgerardo: nobiliario di Sicilia, notizie e stemmi relativi alle famiglie nobili siciliane; Palermo, A. Reber, 1912 2 volumi)
- Roberto Calia: La famiglia del Barone Felice Pastore in Alcamo; Trapani, lito-tip. Nuova Radio, 1988
