= Vincenzo Cecere =

Italian painter

Vincenzo Cecere (1897–1955) was an Italian painter, active in a Realist style.

== Biography ==
He was born in Aversa and initially a pupil of Luigi Pastore, but later enrolled at the Institute of Geometry of Caserta. He served as a soldier in the Austrian front, followed by an exile in Marseille due to his political leanings. He returned to earn a diploma in Naples only by the 1930s. He painted Dopo il bagno, a subject previously treated by the Scapigliatura painter Girolamo Induno. He painted a Portrait of this cousin Amelia, Un bue al pascolo, Head of a Dog, and Portrait of a Girl, likely his cousin Ersilia. He also wrote poetry in Italian and dialect.
