= Annalisa Pastore =

Italian chemist and biologist

Annalisa Pastore MAE
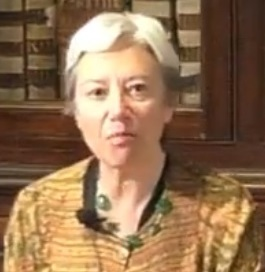
- Pastore in 2017
- Born: Italy
- Education: University of Naples Federico II; ETH Zurich; University of Wisconsin System
- Awards: EMBO Member (2000)
- Scientific career
- Fields: Structural biology NMR; Neurodegeneration; Iron metabolism
- Workplaces: King's College London; University of Oxford; European Molecular Biology Laboratory; National Institute for Medical Research; Scuola Normale Superiore di Pisa; European Synchrotron Radiation Facility
- Website: www.kcl.ac.uk/ioppn/depts/bcn/dri/lab-groups/annalisa-pastore-group/annalisa-pastore-group.aspx

Annalisa Pastore MAE is a Professor of Chemistry and Molecular Biology at King's College London. In 2018, she was appointed full professor at the Scuola Normale Superiore di Pisa. In 2022, she was appointed director of research for life sciences, chemistry and soft matter science at European Synchrotron Radiation Facility. She resigned in Frebruary 2023.

== Education ==
Pastore studied chemistry at the University of Naples Federico II. She earned a master's degree in 1981 and her PhD in 1987. She worked as an exchange student with Richard R. Ernst at ETH Zurich and also at the University of Wisconsin.

== Research ==
Pastore started her career at the University of Oxford as a postdoctoral fellow in the Department of Biochemistry, working alongside Iain Donald Campbell. Pastore was subsequently appointed a staff scientist position at European Molecular Biology Laboratory in 1988. In 1991 she was made group leader of the Structures Program. She joined the National Institute for Medical Research in 1991. She has solved several structures on the Protein Data Bank. She was made an honorary professor at University College London. She took a one-year sabbatical at the French National Institute for Agricultural Research. During this time, she filed several patents related to allergens and their uses.

Pastore worked at King's College London from 2013 to 2018. She has secured several million pounds of funding from Medical Research Council and the Biotechnology and Biological Sciences Research Council. She works on the molecular basis of neurodegeneration. She looks at diseases caused by protein aggregation, including Huntington's disease and Machado–Joseph disease. She also studies pathologies that are a result of misfunctioning of the iron metabolism, including Friedreich's ataxia. She is interested the structure and function of these diseases and uses a range of characterisation techniques, including AFM, EM and ITC calorimetry. She served as the Field Chief Editor for Frontiers Media Molecular Biosciences. She serves as an editor of PeerJ.

In 2018 Pastore was the first woman to be appointed full professor at the faculty of Science of the Scuola Normale Superiore di Pisa.

=== Awards and honours ===
Pastore was elected a member of the Academia Europaea (MAE). She was nominated to AcademiaNet in 2013 and made a member of the European Molecular Biology Organization (EMBO) in 2000.
