= Mauro Pastore =

Italian designer

- Born: 11 August 1967 (age 58); La Spezia, Italy
- Occupations: Designer, Creative Director
- Known for: Co-founder and Creative Director of Cacao Design
- Notable work: Branding and visual identity projects for Italian and international clients
- Website: cacaodesign.it

Mauro Pastore (La Spezia, 11 August 1967) is an Italian designer and co-founder of Cacao Design, a multidisciplinary creative studio based in Milan. He serves as the studio's Creative Director, overseeing projects in branding, communication, packaging, and digital design. He was also the co-founder of Eulda Books, Milano.

He has been active in the Italian design industry for several decades and is known for his collaborative approach with Cacao Design's co-founders Alessandro Floridia and Masa Magnoni.

== Early life and education ==
Pastore was born in La Spezia, Italy on the 11 August 1967.

== Career ==
In 1993, he was one of the founders of Inox Design, a Milanese design firm, where he worked for ten years (1993–2003). Between 1997 and 2002, he also spent one or two months each year as a freelance Senior Designer for Baker Brand Communications in Santa Monica, California and Mucca Design in New York.

In 2004, Pastore co-founded Cacao Design in Milan together with Alessandro Floridia and Masa Magnoni. Since its establishment, the studio has operated as a multidisciplinary agency offering services across branding, naming, visual identity systems, packaging, exhibitions, editorial design, and digital communication.

As creative director, Pastore was instrumental in shaping Cacao Design's distinctive philosophy, expressed by the principle “Essence before Shape.” This concept emphasizes that strategy and brand values should come before visual form in the design process. Under his leadership, the studio has built a diverse portfolio for clients in the real estate, corporate, hospitality, and food industries, including Bizzi & Partners, BNP Paribas CityLife, Coima, Cushman & Wakefield, Generali, Redilco, and Hines.

Projects created under Pastore's creative direction have received multiple awards and international recognition, including honors from the ADI Design Index, the International Design Awards (IDA), the Red Dot Design Award, the Type Directors Club (TDC), D&AD, Graphis, and the Art Directors Club Italiano (ADCI). His work has been published in numerous design annuals and featured in exhibitions dedicated to communication and branding design.

Together with his Cacao Design partners, in 2006, Mauro founded Eulda Books, a new publishing house with the goal of promoting excellence in design through publications of the highest quality. The first publishing project was launched in February 2006, Eulda, the European Logo Design Annual, which as of January ‘08 evolved into Wolda, the Worldwide Logo Design Annual.

== Other positions ==
In addition to his design practice, Pastore has taken part as a juror and speaker in design events and competitions, contributing to discussions on contemporary branding and visual communication in Italy and internationally. In October 2006, Pastore served on the jury for ReBrand 2007, an international design competition.

Mauro Pastore is a professional member of the following associations: AIAP (Associazione Italiana per la Comunicazione Visiva), TDC (Type Directors Club) and AIGA (the professional association for design).

== Recognition ==
Cacao Design's work under Pastore's creative direction has been recognized by international award programs and publications, positioning the studio among notable contributors to contemporary Italian design.

== Personal life ==
Mauro Pastore is based in Milan, Italy.
