= Pia Opera Pastore =

Italian defunct charity institution

- Founded: 1870
- Founder: baron Felice Pastore Cambon
- Dissolved: 2000
- Type: Private foundation
- Location: Alcamo, Sicily, Italy
- Region served: Alcamo and neighbouring towns

The Pia Opera Pastore was a private charitable institution, mainly in support of poor and sick people, which had its seat in the palace of the baron Felice Pastore near Porta Trapani, in Alcamo .

== Historical hints ==
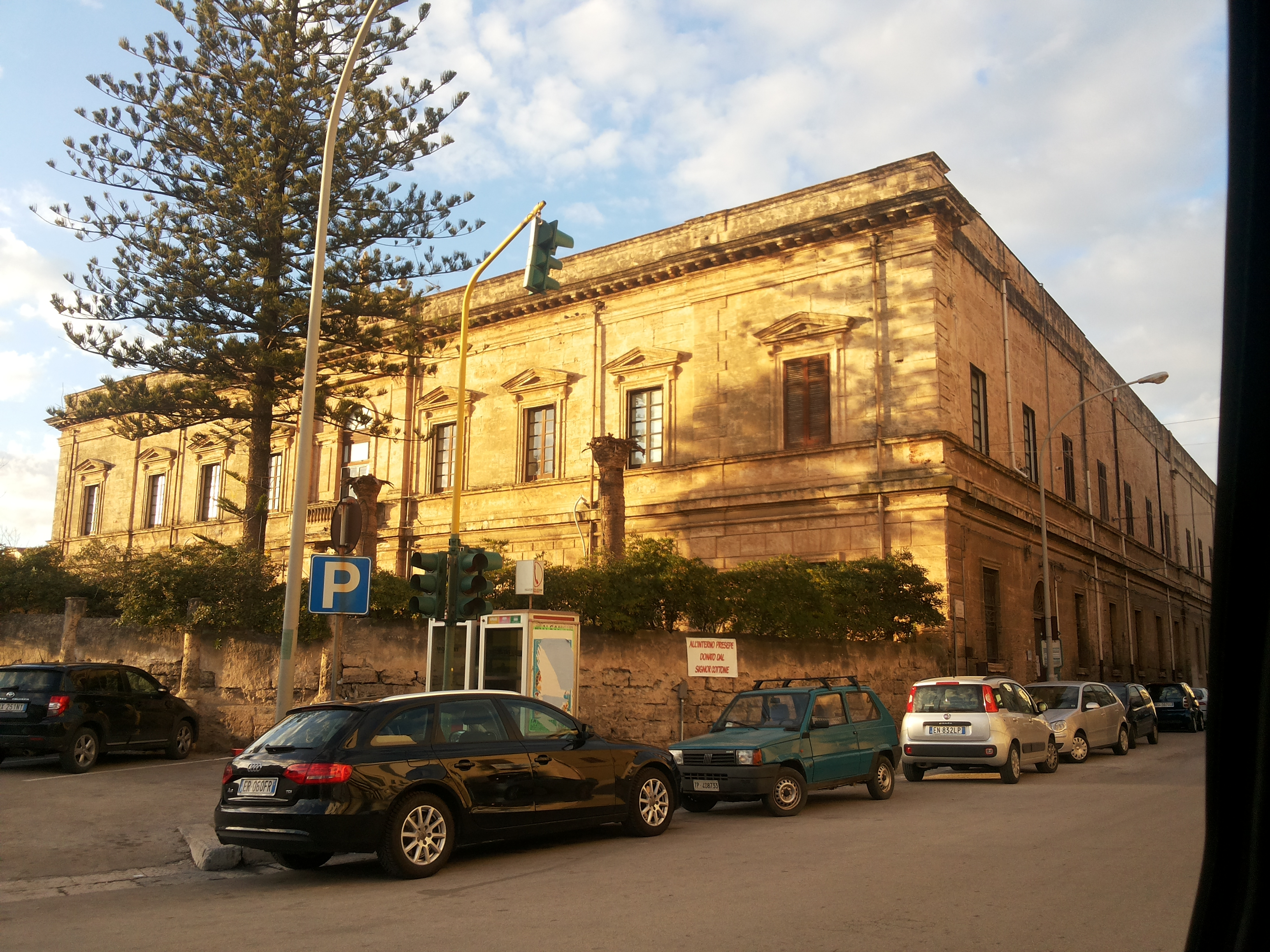
The palace of Pia Opera Pastore today

The building was constructed between 1870 and 1874, following the testamentary dispositions of the baron Felice Pastore Cambon, and assigned to the Daughters of Charity of Saint Vincent de Paul. His wife, that is Donna Stefania Naselli di Montaperto of the dukes of Gela and sister of Giovan Battista Naselli, the archbishop of Palermo (1853–1870), was decisive in fetching the Nuns of Charity to Alcamo. In fact, even if she could stop the foundation of this institution, as she survived her husband, she did not do it, on the contrary she helped it.

Its main purposes were the following:

- Housing girls to educate and instruct them, in order to be useful to themselves and to society.
- Daily hosting external girls in apposite rooms, in order to receive the religious education and instruction appropriate for their class, preferring the poorer ones.
- Daily curing of the sick people, external to the institution, in some separate rooms, and doing home-based health care: these activities had to be done by the Daughters of Charity.

The foundation had also to keep a dispensary and a pharmacy for the people in need that the Nuns had to care.

Initially, from 1870 to 1874, it operated at Palazzo Pastore in corso 6 Aprile, then it moved to the seat in via Pia Opera Pastore. The first Mother superior was Suor Luisa Castets, a French woman from Besançon and in the first years of its activity classes were given in French.

In 1913, owing to financial problems, they modified the statute and closed the pharmacy; between 1914 and 1916 it was the seat of a private Teachers' training school (Istituto Magistrale). Thanks to a financing by the Ministry of the Interior, there was an antitubercular preventive sanatorium for children who were lodged at the prophylactic Dispensary, if they were sick, and went back home when they had recovered their health.

In 1945 they set up an infirmary, a new hall for sick people; in 1954 they opened a nursery school, which was closed in 1958. Owing to the 1968 Belice earthquake, the premises were unfit for use, but the nuns went on assisting the earthquake victims from Alcamo and the neighbouring towns.

The building is internally divided into three wings, with the chapel in the central one on the ground floor, which you can enter through a lobby; there were the waiting room, the secretary's office, service rooms and a large corridor here. The right wing was occupied by the nursery school and the left one by the elementary school, that was free for poor families and fee-paying for the rich ones.

In the rooms adjoining the chapel there were the kitchen and the refectory; on the first floor there were once the dormitory and the laboratory of cutting and embroidery. In 1956 they built a new wing for the Preventorium, closed in the sixties thanks to the improvement of the hygienic and sanitarian conditions in Alcamo. Later, in 2000 the nuns were moved.

At present the premises belong to IPAB (Public Institutions of Assistance and Charity: Opere Pie Pastore and San Pietro): some of them are rent for vocational training courses, others are used as a hospitality centre for non-EU immigrants.

== Association Figlie di Maria, Ladies of Charity and Female Crusaders of Purity ==
In 1870 the Vincentian nuns, or Daughters of Charity were called to start the activity of Pia Opera Pastore; one year later they founded the Association Figlie di Maria (the Virgin Mary's Daughters), soon approved by the superior General, which adopted the Statute that was in force in Italy and continued its activity until 2000.

On 29 July 1900 the Association "Dame di Carità" (that is Ladies of Charity) was founded by Sister Margherita Castets, Mother Superior of Opera Pia: it was formed by women who wanted to devote themselves to the comfort of sick people, the outcasts and the poor. The main purpose was promoting spiritual and charitable activities, obtaining food, clothes and money. The members had to be devotee of Saint Vincent de Paul and the Blessed Luisa di Marillac, imitating the virtue, above all charity, praying, receiving Holy Communion and saying the Rosary in suffrage of the dead sisters.

The association helped the soldiers' families during World War I, and after Caporetto, it gave support and food to the refugees who were in Alcamo; other important activities were: for the endemic diseases in the period 1929–39, for the soldiers camped in Alcamo during World War II (1935–1951) and various activities financed by the regional government of Sicily between 1944 and 1960.

In 1924 they founded the Association Little Ladies of Charity, whose protector was Saint Luisa di Marillac: its members were girls aged 16, 17 and 18, wearing a blue skirt, a white blouse and black shoes.

Their purposes were:

- Visiting periodically poor people and prisoners
- taking care of the sick
- getting clothes for the people in need.

During the period of the crisis in the 1920s, these Little Ladies cooperated with the Nuns, collecting wheat and flour, and getting funds for poor families through different activities like theatre, concerts, etc.

During World War II, they visited hospitalized soldiers to provide assistance. During this period, the Pia Opera provided aid, serving a daily hot meal to more than 1,000 people and a school meal to more than 100 children.

Besides, every year on 15 March (the feast of Saint Luisa di Marillac), on 19 July (Saint Vincent de Paul), and on 20 November (Saint Elizabeth of Hungary) they offered a lunch for the poor in the garden.

In 1935 the bishop of Mazara del Vallo (considering what they had agreed in the national congress held in Rome in 1932, the statute of the Ladies of Charity and after a meeting with all the parsons of the town) established that all the parishes had to found the parish associations of the Ladies of Charity. This decision, taken with the unanimous agreement of the parsons, and with a specific statute, helped the decentralization of the charitable activities connected with Pia Opera Pastore.

Since 2 October 1976 the Association was absorbed by the "Juvenile Group of Vincentian Volunteering ".

Finally, on 30 May 1935 Sister Elvira La Paglia founded the association of the "Female Crusaders of Purity": upon admission they swore " to detest indecent fashion". The purpose of this association was to "divulge good and sound customs against the spreading of unseemliness and wordliness of fashion". The association is not existing any longer. ".

== Description and works in the Chapel ==
The architectonic structure is in neoclassic style, with triangular-shaped windows. Above the front door there is the Pastore family's coat of arms, represented by a shepherd's crook, three stars and a tower; there is also a balcony of honour with a parapet and small columns.

The chapel, adjoining the foundation, is dedicated to saint Francis of Sales; with one nave, three altars in grey and white marble and some fine architectonic parts in the 18th century Roman style. The building was realized after the design of Giovan Battista Palazzotto and Agostino Castiglia, two architects from Palermo.

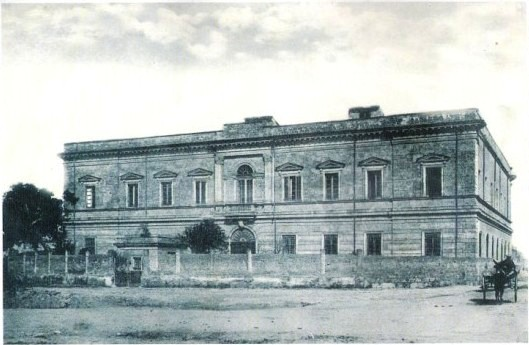
A vintage photo of the façade

The chapel was restored in 1983 and has twelve columns, Corinthian capitals, a dome with a large skylight; there are these works:

- The white marble high altar realized by Vincenzo Venezia in 1877, with a great circular tabernacle having six columns with gilded corinthian capitals; above the altar there is a large painting of the Immaculata made in 1866 by Natale Carta from Messina. The Virgin Mary is depicted while looking at heaven and her joined hands: she is wearing a dark red dress and a dark blue mantle.
- A mosaic made by Gaetano Costa from Alcamo on the central panel of the altar: it represents three circles (symbolizing the Holy Trinity) with the Lamb of God holding the Book of Life.
- Ambon: designed by the architect Settipani, it symbolizes Jesus Christ's empty sepulchre, from which they announce the Gospel.
- Left altar: Saint Francis of Sales, a painting made in 1890 by Giuseppe Di Giovanni from Palermo; the saint is in ectasy among a host of angels.
- Right altar: Saint Vincent de Paul, a painting made in 1890 by Giuseppe Di Giovanni; Saint Vincent de Paul is represented while talking with three Sisters of Charity and six little orphans are listening to him.
- On the right side of the choir: the gravestone in memory of the two barons Pastore; wife and husband, buried here.
- Two marble busts of the baron Felice Pastore and Stefania Naselli, in the lobby.
- Some candelabrums

In the sacristy and in the parlour there are these paintings:

- the Blessed Giovan Gabriele Perboyre (1926), made by the priest Francesco Alesi; it represents a young Vincentian missionary with the cassock and folded arms, holding a small palm with his left hand and embracing a cross with the right one
- the Blessed Francesco Regis Clet (1924), painted by the priest Francesco Alesi; it represents a young missionary leaning on a sparkling cross, with his right hand on the chest and holding a palm with the left one.
- Santa Luisa di Marillac: painted by Francesco Alesi too; the saint is kneeling with the crown and a cross on her hand, contemplating a statue of Our Lady. Behind her there are two nuns assisting poor people.
- Saint Francis of Sales: by an unknown author; the Saint is sitting on an armchair and wearing a violet tunic, a penitent is wearing 18th century clothes. The Saint is pointing to a dove symbolizing the Holy Ghost to him.

Today the chapel is used for religious services and meetings of religious kind.

== See also ==
- Barone Felice Pastore
- San Vincenzo de Paoli
- Luisa di Marillac
- Congregazione di carità
- Istituto pubblico di assistenza e beneficenza

== Sources ==
- Carlo Cataldo: Guida storico-artistica dei beni culturali di Alcamo-Calatafimi-Castellammare Golfo p. 82; Sarograf, Alcamo, 1982
- Carlo Cataldo: La conchiglia di S.Giacomo p. 149,168, 231;Campo, Alcamo, 2001
- Carlo Cataldo: Il ponte e gli alberi; Campo, Alcamo, 2000
- Roberto Calia: L'istituto Pia Opera Pastore e lo Spirito di S.Vincenzo de Paoli in Alcamo; Campo, Alcamo, 1985
