= Neobrachychilus =

Scientific classification
- Kingdom: Animalia
- Phylum: Arthropoda
- Class: Insecta
- Order: Coleoptera
- Suborder: Polyphaga
- Infraorder: Cucujiformia
- Family: Cerambycidae
- Genus: Neobrachychilus
- Species: N. consobrinus

Binomial name
- Neobrachychilus consobrinus (Lane, 1939)

Genus of beetles

Neobrachychilus consobrinus is a species of beetle in the family Cerambycidae, and the only species in the genus Neobrachychilus. It was described by Lane in 1939.
