= Torricella Sicura =

- Comune
- Comune di Torricella Sicura
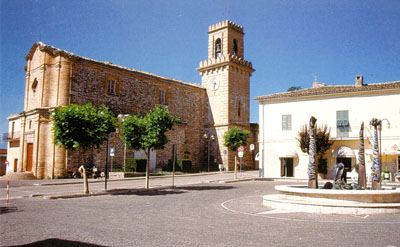

- Coat of arms

- Location within Italy Location within Abruzzo
- Coordinates: 42°39′N 13°39′E
- Country: Italy
- Region: Abruzzo
- Province: Teramo (TE)
- Frazioni: Abetemozzo, Antanemuccio, Borgonovo, Costumi, Corvacchiano, Ginepri, Ioanella, Magliano, Morricone, Pastignano, Piano Grande, Poggio Rattieri, Poggio Valle, San Felice, San Pietro, Tizzano, Valle Piola, Villa Popolo, Villa Riccio, Villa Tofo

Area
  - Total: 54 km^{2} (21 sq mi)
- Elevation: 437 m (1,434 ft)

Population (1 January 2007)
  - Total: 2,724
  - Density: 50/km^{2} (130/sq mi)
- Demonym: Torricellesi
- Time zone: UTC+1 (CET)
  - Summer (DST): UTC+2 (CEST)
- Postal code: 64010
- Dialing code: 0861
- Patron saint: Saint Paul
- Saint day: 29 June
- Website: Official website

Torricella Sicura Town Center

Snow Covered Church

Torricella Sicura is a town and comune in the province of Teramo, in the Abruzzo region of central Italy. It is located in the Gran Sasso e Monti della Laga National Park, about 6 kilometres (4 mi) from the provincial capital of Teramo.
