= Piola (beetle) =

Scientific classification
- Kingdom: Animalia
- Phylum: Arthropoda
- Class: Insecta
- Order: Coleoptera
- Suborder: Polyphaga
- Infraorder: Cucujiformia
- Family: Cerambycidae
- Subfamily: Lamiinae
- Tribe: Phacellini
- Genus: Piola; Marinoni, 1974

Genus of beetles

Piola is a genus in the long-horned beetle family Cerambycidae. There are about six described species in Piola, found in the Neotropics.

== Species ==
These six species belong to the genus Piola:

- Piola colombica Martins & Galileo, 1999 (South America)
- Piola quiabentiae Marinoni, 1974 (Bolivia, Brazil, Argentina, and Paraguay)
- Piola rubra Martins & Galileo, 1999 (Bolivia)
- Piola schiffi Galileo, Santos-Silva & Bezark, 2017
- Piola unicolor Martins & Galileo, 1999 (Brazil)
- Piola wappesi Nascimento, Botero & Santos-Silva, 2018
