= Mpanjaka pastor =

Scientific classification
- Domain: Eukaryota
- Kingdom: Animalia
- Phylum: Arthropoda
- Class: Insecta
- Order: Lepidoptera
- Superfamily: Noctuoidea
- Family: Erebidae
- Genus: Mpanjaka
- Species: M. pastor

Binomial name
- Mpanjaka pastor (Butler, 1882)

Synonyms
- Calliteara pastor Butler, 1882

Species of moth

Mpanjaka pastor is a moth of the family Erebidae first described by Arthur Gardiner Butler in 1882. It is found in central Madagascar.

The wings of this species are emerald green, spotted with snow white, irregularly striped with grey and crossed by three sinuated black lines. It wears a 3-shaped discocellular black spot. The body is sandy yellow flecked with white, abdomen is brownish with white edged segments.

The male of this species has a wingspan of 34 mm. It was described based on a specimen from Ankafana, central Madagascar.

== See also ==
- List of moths of Madagascar
