= Antonio Cecere =

Italian writer (born 1978)

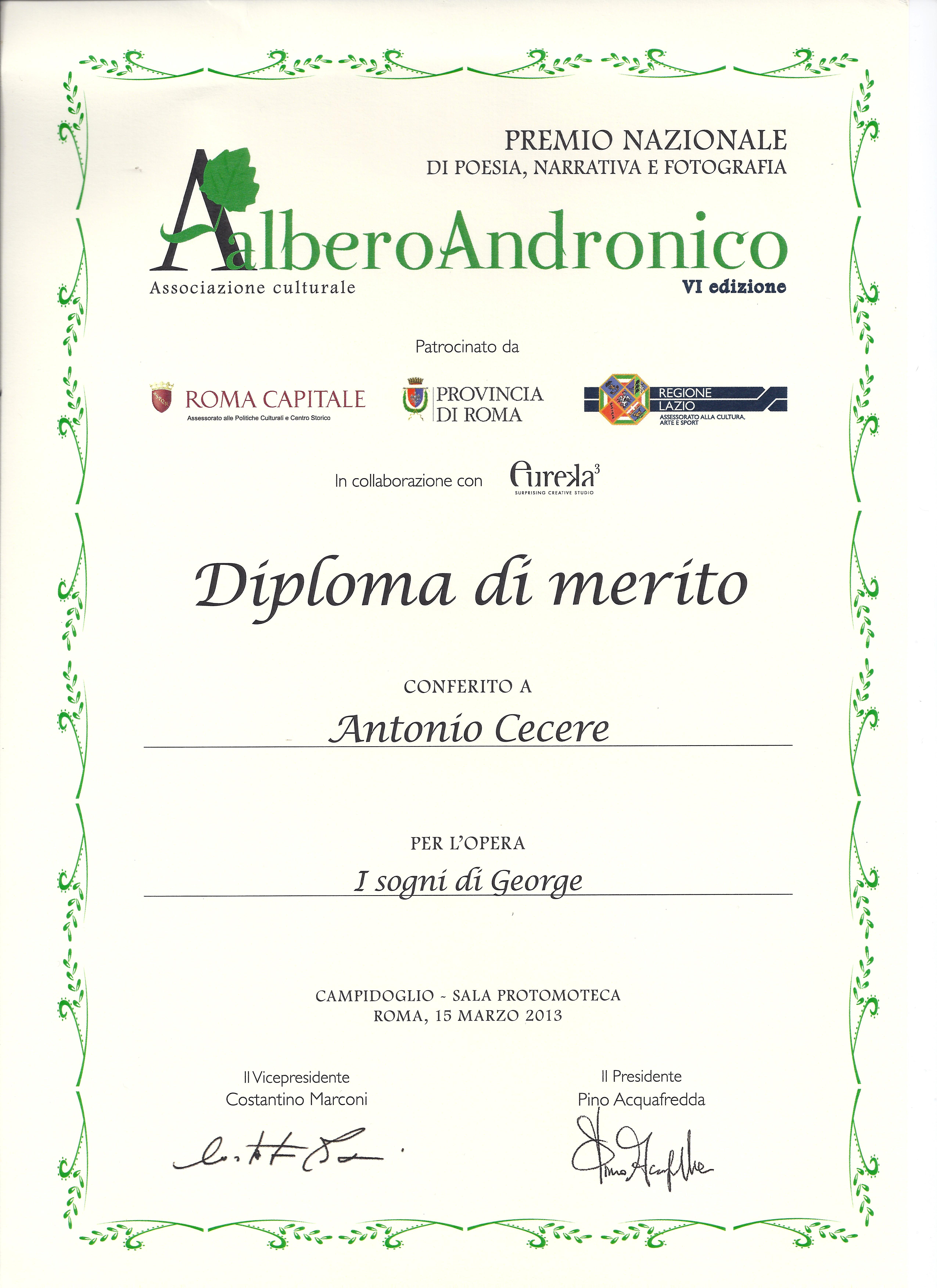
Diploma di Merito for I Sogni di George

Antonio Cecere (born 1978) is an Italian author.

Cecere was born in Naples and has lived in London since 1997. He established himself as a writer at a young age, publishing in 1998 the novel Farfalle. In 2004 his second novel "I Sogni di George" was published in English in the United States under the title George Tonali's Dreams.

In 2013 Cecere was awarded the Diploma di Merito at the Premio Nazionale Albero Andronico for "I Sogni di George".

Literary critic Carmine di Biase positioned Antonio Cecere's writing between Italo Calvino and Umberto Eco for style and content.

"Few writers this century managed to show a similar depth of psychological self-analysis: Calvino in Palomar, Saint'Exupery in Le Petit Prince and Gibran in The Prophet." Chiara Rubino, 2004

"[...]I believe a new kind of writer is born, for his geniality of style and deep understanding of human self-discovery." Carmine Di Biase, 2004
