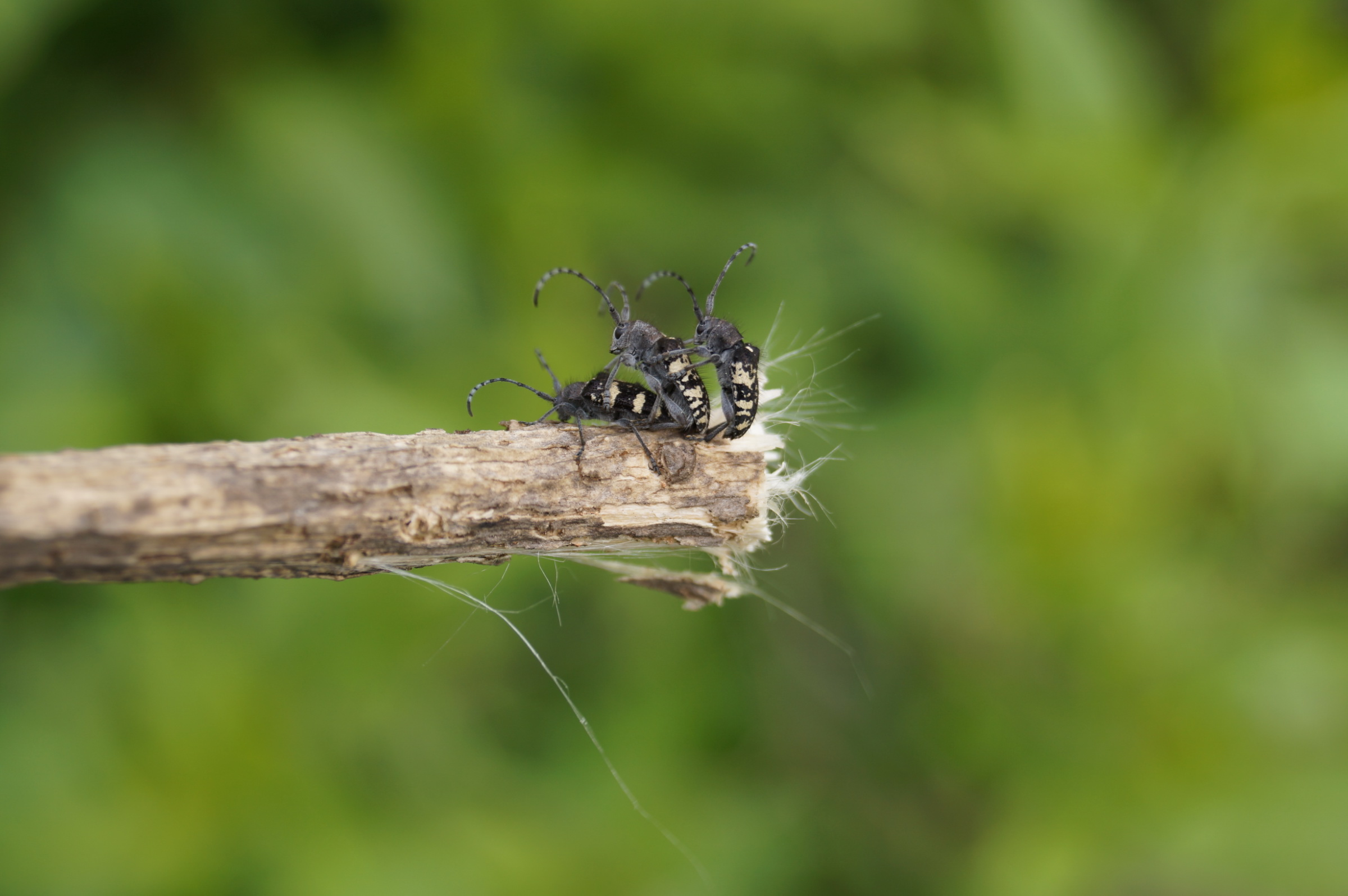
- Brachychilus scutellaris

Scientific classification
- Kingdom: Animalia
- Phylum: Arthropoda
- Class: Insecta
- Order: Coleoptera
- Suborder: Polyphaga
- Infraorder: Cucujiformia
- Family: Cerambycidae
- Genus: Brachychilus; Blanchard in Gay, 1851

Species
- See text

= Brachychilus =

Genus of beetles

Brachychilus is a genus of longhorn beetles of the subfamily Lamiinae, containing the following species:

- Brachychilus chevrolatii Thomson, 1868
- Brachychilus literatus Blanchard in Gay, 1851
- Brachychilus scutellaris Blanchard in Gay, 1851
- Brachychilus wagenknechti Cerda, 1954
