= Alonso Piola =

Italian-Brazilian footballer (born 1979)

Personal information
- Full name: Alonso Piola
- Date of birth: 1 November 1979 (age 46)
- Place of birth: Concórdia, Brazil
- Height: 1.87 m (6 ft 1 1/2 in)
- Position: Forward

Youth career
- Internazionale

Senior career*
Years	Team	Apps	(Gls)
1999–2003	Internazionale		
2000	→ Gualdo (loan)		
2000–2001	→ Tirol Innsbruck (loan)		
2001–2002	→ Pro Sesto (loan)		
2002–2003	→ Sassuolo (loan)	4	(0)
2003	→ Castel di Sangro (loan)		
2004–2005	Wohlen	21	(6)
2005–2006	Rivarolese	19	(7)
2006–2009	Concórdia		
2010	Juventude-SC		
- * Club domestic league appearances and goals

Alonso Piola (born 1 November 1979) is an Italian Brazilian footballer who plays as a forward. He is a relative of the former Italian footballer Silvio Piola.

== Career ==
Piola started his career in Italy with Internazionale. He was loaned to Gualdo, then to Austrian club Tirol Innsbruck., Pro Sesto (along with Luca Anania) and Sassuolo along with Daniele Ricci. Piola returned to Inter in January, and then left for Castel di Sangro of Serie C2. In 2004–05 season he left for Challenge League side Wohlen.

In May 2007 Piola returned to his hometown club Concórdia for 2007 Campeonato Catarinense Divisão de Acesso and 2009 Campeonato Catarinense Divisão Especial.

In May 2010 he left Concórdia for Juventude of Santa Catarina.
