= Villa Popolo =

Village in Teramo, Abruzzo, Italy

Coordinates: 42°39′39″N 13°37′13″E

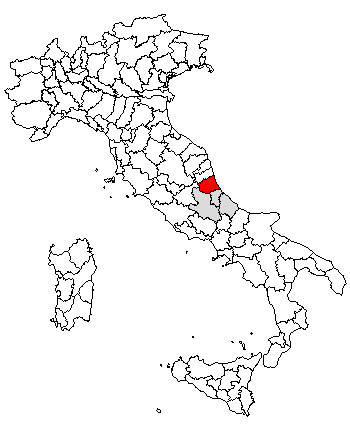
Location of Teramo in Italy

Villa Popolo is a small village in the province of Teramo, in the Abruzzo region of central Italy. It is a frazione of the comune of Torricella Sicura.

== Geography ==
It is located next to the small community of Ioanella and about 1.5 miles from Teramo, the provincial capital.

== See also ==
- Abruzzo (wine)
