= Girolamo Pastore =

Italian painter

Girolamo Pastore (late 19th century) was an Italian painter.

He initially trained with his grandfather. He painted a Pietà at the mother chapel of the cemetery in Aversa. At the same church are two canvases attributed to him, depicting Vision of Ezekiel and Christ at Gethsemane.
