= Phacellini =

Scientific classification
- Kingdom: Animalia
- Phylum: Arthropoda
- Clade: Pancrustacea
- Class: Insecta
- Order: Coleoptera
- Suborder: Polyphaga
- Infraorder: Cucujiformia
- Family: Cerambycidae
- Subfamily: Lamiinae
- Tribe: Phacellini

Tribe of beetles

Phacellini is a tribe of longhorn beetles of the subfamily Lamiinae.

== Taxonomy ==
- Brachychilus
- Eurycallinus
- Neobrachychilus
- Phacellus
- Piola
- Scolochilus
- Tuberopeplus
