= Donna Pastore =

Donna L. Pastore a professor of sport management at Ohio State University, US, in the School of Physical Activity & Educational Services, and the coordinator of Sport and Exercise Management at Ohio State. She was a president of the National Association for Girls and Women in Sport.

Pastore started off as an instructor at Penn State in 1981, and in 1988 she was promoted to assistant professor. In 1991, she became an assistant professor at Ohio State University. In 1996, she was promoted to associate professor, and full professor in 2002. In 2017, Pastore was elected a Fellow of the National Academy of Kinesiology.

== Education ==
- Bachelor's degree in physical education from the University of Florida in 1981.
- Master's degree in physical education from the University of Florida in 1983
- Doctorate in Education Administration from the University of Southern California in 1988.

== Awards ==
- Earle F. Zeigler Lecture Award, 2002
- Fellow of National Academy of Kinesiology, 2017
