= Domenico Cecere =

Italian footballer (1972–2023)

Personal information
- Date of birth: 14 December 1972
- Place of birth: Caserta, Italy
- Date of death: 2 April 2023 (aged 50)
- Place of death: Carinola, Italy
- Height: 1.87 m (6 ft 2 in)
- Position: Goalkeeper

Youth career
- Napoli

Senior career*
| Years | Team | Apps | (Gls) |
| 1990–1992 | Napoli | 0 | (0) |
| 1992–1993 | Palermo | 0 | (0) |
| 1993–1995 | Nola | 39 | (0) |
| 1995–1996 | Turris | 4 | (0) |
| 1996–1997 | Bisceglie | 31 | (0) |
| 1997–1999 | Pescara | 4 | (0) |
| 1999–2000 | Fermana | 42 | (0) |
| 2000–2002 | Messina | 20 | (0) |
| 2001–2002 | → Treviso (loan) | 0 | (0) |
| 2002 | → Pescara (loan) | 4 | (0) |
| 2002–2007 | Avellino | 141 | (0) |
| 2007–2008 | Cavese | 6 | (0) |
| 2008 | Potenza | 9 | (0) |
| 2008–2009 | Gela | 32 | (0) |
| 2009–2010 | Siracusa | 18 | (0) |
| 2011 | Messina | 16 | (0) |
| Total | | 366 | (0) |
- * Club domestic league appearances and goals

Domenico Cecere (14 December 1972 – 2 April 2023), was an Italian professional footballer who played as a goalkeeper.

== Career ==
Revealed by Napoli, Cecere played for several Italian football teams, especially in Serie B and Serie C1. He made 141 appearances for Avellino and ended his career at Messina in 2011.

== Death ==
Cecere died of a heart attack at age 50, on 2 April 2023.

== Honours ==
Palermo

- Serie C1: 1992–93 (group B)
- Coppa Italia Serie C: 1992–93

Fermana

- Serie C1: 1998–99 (group B)

Avellino

- Serie C1: 2002–03 (group B)
