= Nicholas Caglioni =

Italian football goalkeeper

Personal information
- Date of birth: 14 January 1983 (age 43)
- Place of birth: Nembro, Italy
- Height: 1.89 m (6 ft 2 in)
- Position: Goalkeeper

Youth career
- 2000–2001: Atalanta

Senior career*
Years	Team	Apps	(Gls)
2001–2005	Atalanta	0	(0)
2001–2002	→ Fanfulla (loan)	20	(0)
2002–2003	→ U.S.O. Calcio (loan)	31	(0)
2003–2004	→ Aglianese (loan)	32	(0)
2005–2007	Messina	11	(0)
2009–2010	Pro Patria	27	(0)
2011	Salernitana	15	(0)
2011–2012	Modena	39	(0)
2012–2014	Crotone	28	(0)
2014–2015	Lecce	43	(0)
2015–2018	FeralpiSalò	81	(0)
- * Club domestic league appearances and goals as of 22 April 2018

Nicholas Caglioni (born 14 January 1983) is an Italian football goalkeeper.

== Career ==
Formerly a Serie A player for Messina with a total 11 appearances in the Italian top flight, Caglioni was banned from football for two years after he tested positive for cocaine after a Serie A match against Catania on February 11, 2007. His ban was expired on March 15, 2009; after the expiring, he joined Pro Patria of Lega Pro Prima Divisione.

In January 2011 he joined Salernitana on a free transfer, serving as first-choice keeper in the club's rise into the promotion playoffs, then lost to Verona. In July 2011 he joined Serie B club Modena, after his contract with Salernitana expired.
