= Fortezza di Civitella del Tronto =

Fortress in Civitella del Tronto, Italy

Coordinates: 42.7731°N 13.6669°E

Fortress of Civitella del Tronto
- Fortezza di Civitella del Tronto
- Civitella del Tronto
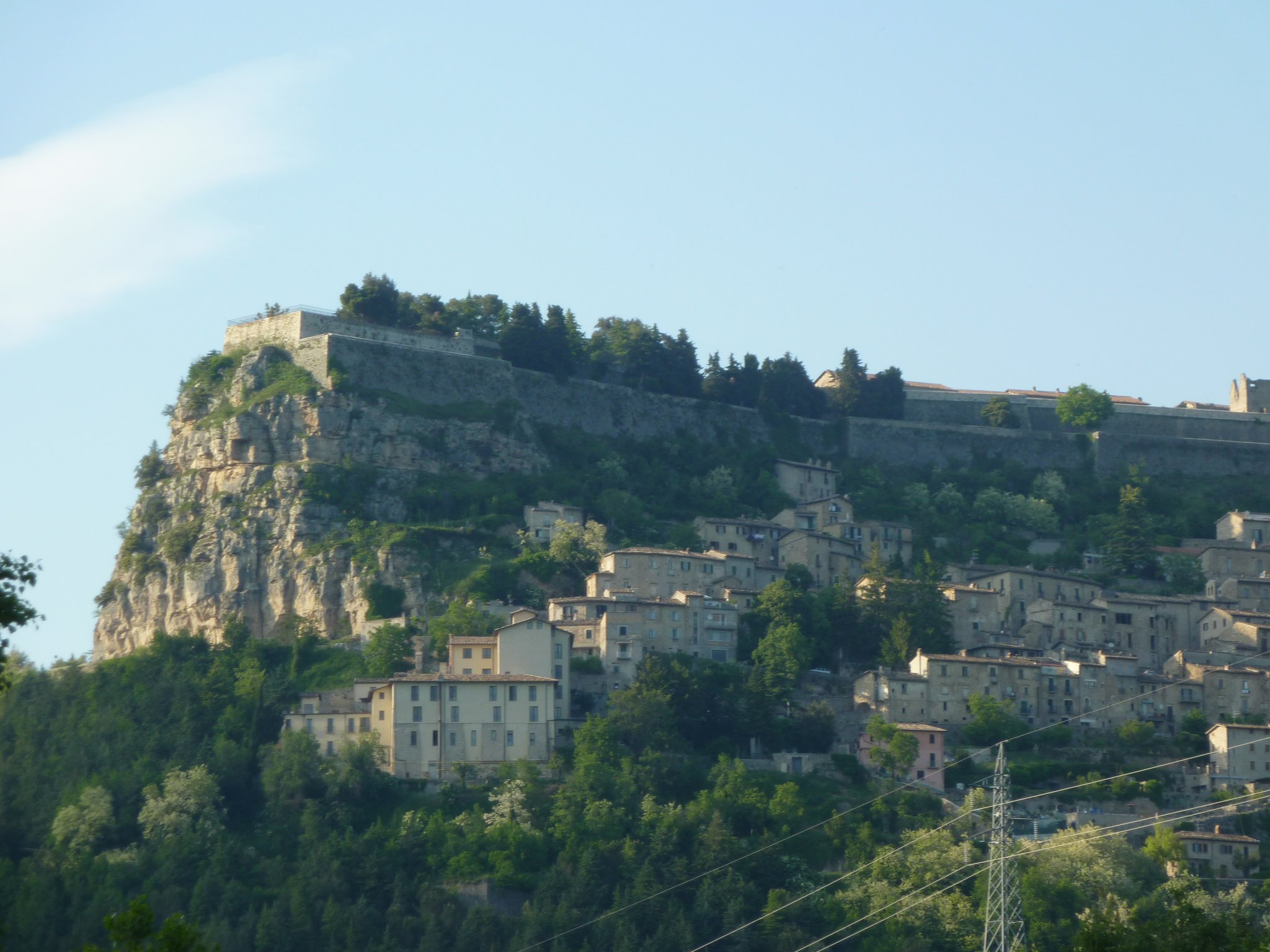
- View of the fortress

Site information
- Type: Castle

Location
- Location within Italy

Site history
- Built: 1564

Fortezza di Civitella del Tronto (Italian for Fortress of Civitella del Tronto) is a fortress in Civitella del Tronto, Province of Teramo (Abruzzo).

== Description ==
The Fortezza di Civitella del Tronto is a fortified structure erected as a stronghold aimed at controlling the territory, with tactical and defensive functions. This powerful structure was built to protect the strategic area it occupies, rising near the rocky ridge overlooking the urban center of Civitella del Tronto, the seat of the homonymous Abruzzo municipality, in the province of Teramo.

The complex of the defensive settlement represents one of the most important strongholds of the Kingdom of Naples during the Spanish Viceroyalty and imposing military engineering works carried out on the soil of Southern Italy. Due to its size, it can be compared to the Forte della Brunetta, built by the Piedmontese near the city of Susa and the Hohensalzburg Fortress in Salzburg, with which it has been twinned since 1989. Its constructions extend for a length of about 500 meters and an average width of 45 meters, covering an area of 25,000 m^{2}.

With its 45,000 annual visitors (2016 data), it has been the most visited monument in Abruzzo.

The site is primarily remembered for being the last bastion of the Kingdom of the Two Sicilies to surrender to the Piedmontese on March 20, 1861, three days after the coronation of King Vittorio Emanuele II.

== Physical Geography ==
The fortification was built at an altitude of over 600 meters above sea level in the area near the border line between the Ascolana and Aprutina counties and rises its constructions in a dominant position over the inhabited nucleus of the town, on the hill between the Vibrata River and the Salinello River. From the ramparts, there is a wide panorama that stretches from the Salinello valley to the Vibrata Valley to the Tronto Valley. Also visible are the Twin Mountains, the massifs of the Gran Sasso, the Monti della Laga, the Majella, Monte Ascensione, and the Adriatic Sea.

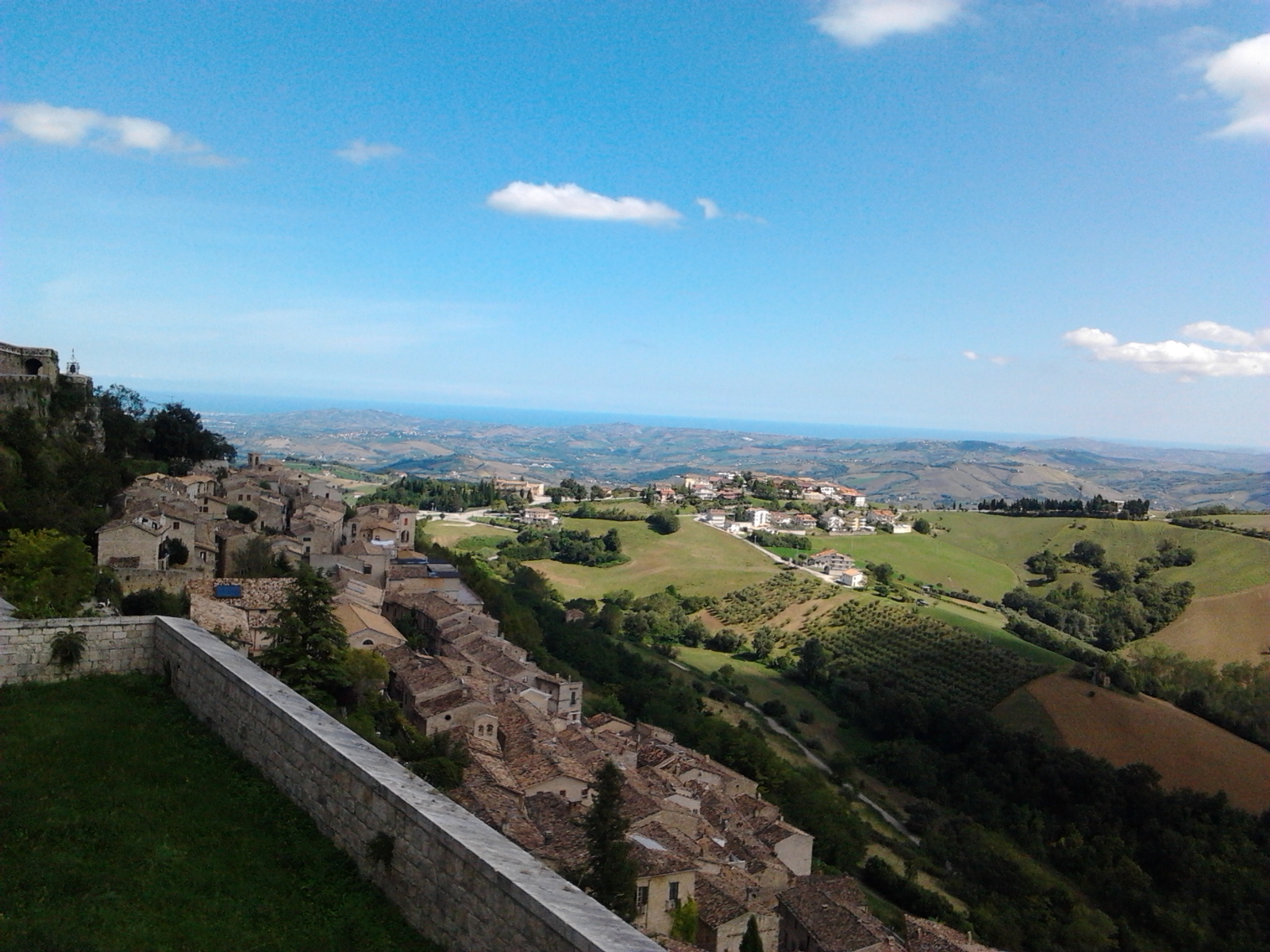
The town of Civitella seen from the panoramic walkway of the fortress.

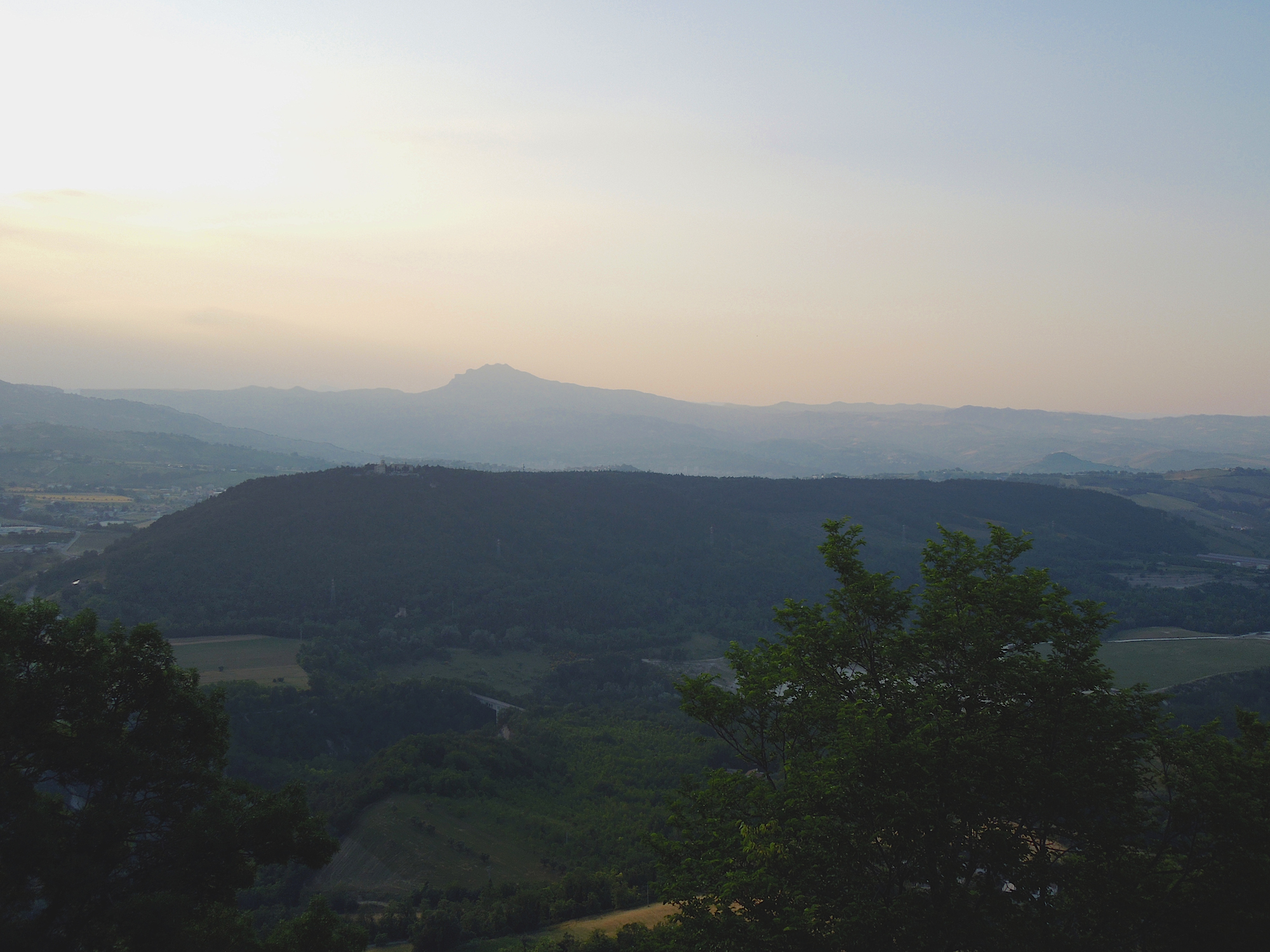
Panorama from the fortress over the Montesanto Abbey and Monte Ascensione.

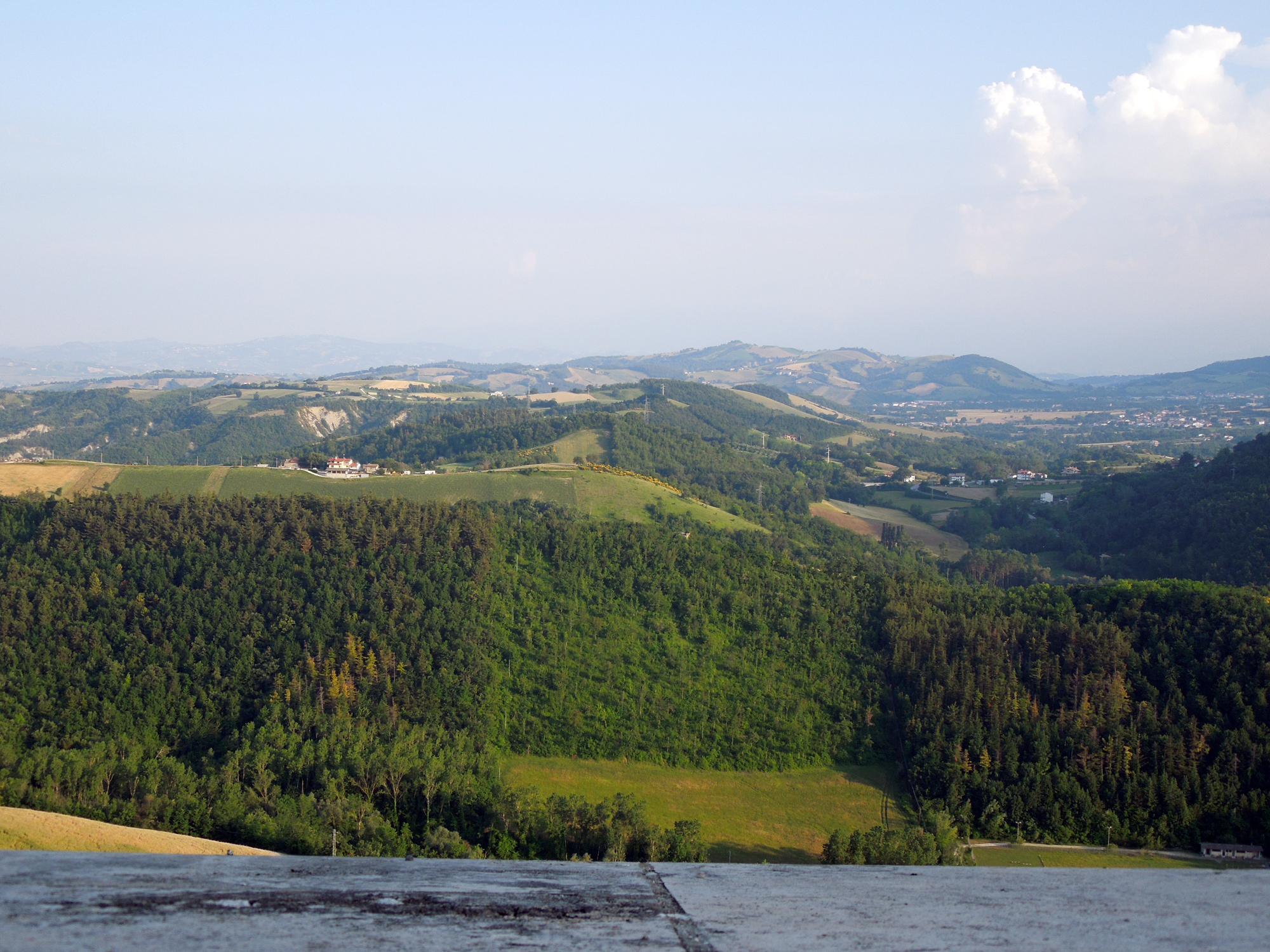
Panorama

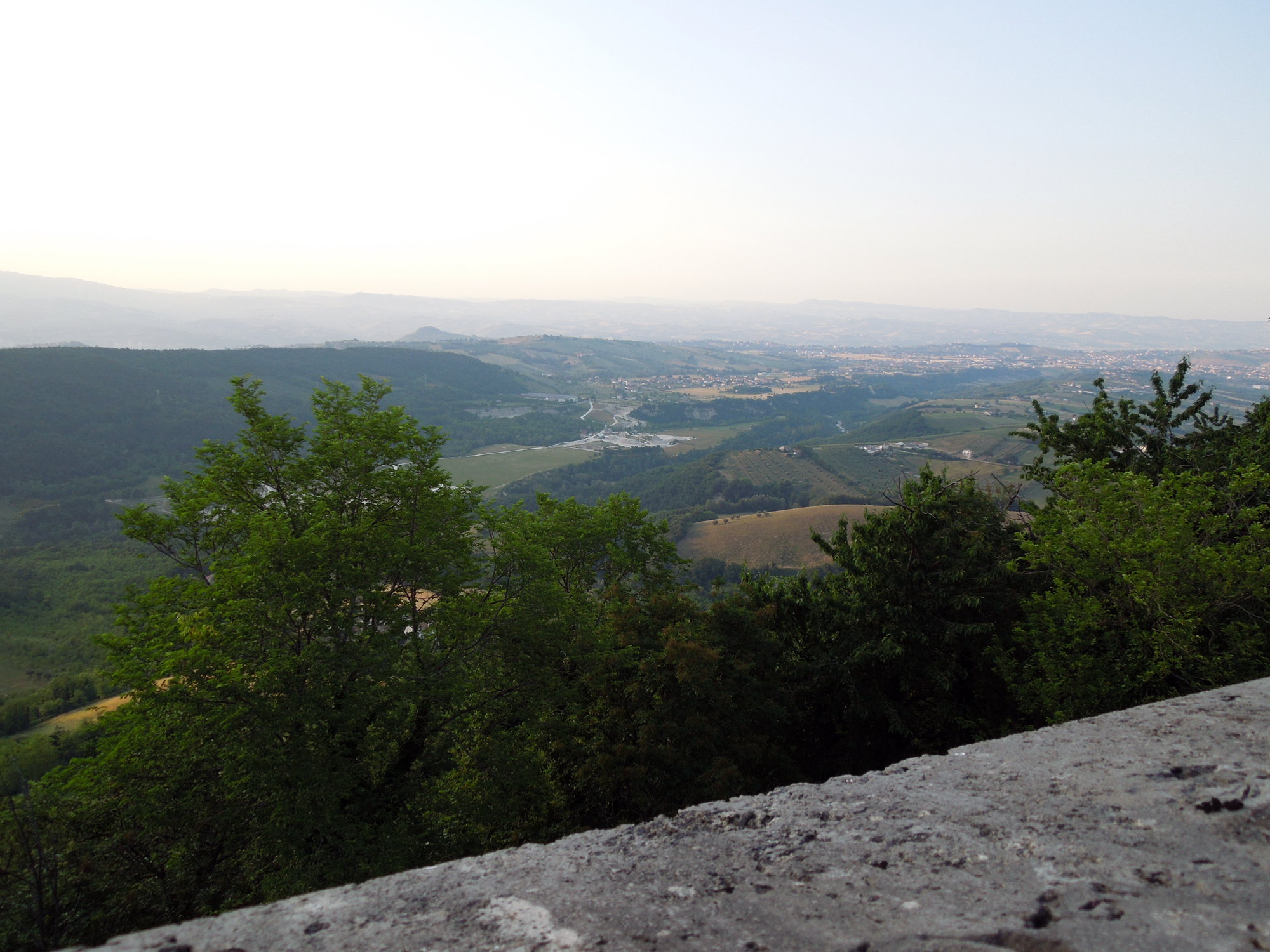
Panorama

== History ==
Historical sources attest to the existence of writings from the 11th century mentioning the village of Civitella. The year 1001 is mentioned, referring to a donation deed signed by Raterio, son of Giuseppe, describing the curtis of Tibitella, guarding the border of the Salinello between the Ascoli county and the Aprutina county. This was followed, in 1069, by another donation deed signed by Siolfo, son of Trasmondo and grandson of Trasmondo, who assigned the ownership of the castle of Civitellae to Stefano, Bishop of Ascoli.
Civitella was positioned to guard the Salinello border, and in the centuries that followed, the vicissitudes of the defensive garrison saw the alternation of the retreat or advance of the territorial demarcation line dividing the sovereignty of the two jurisdictions.

On January 30, 1255, Pope Alexander IV confirmed the power over the fortress to Teodino, Bishop of Ascoli, and urged the Ascolans to fortify and repair the castle of Civitella.

Later, Charles I of Anjou, organizing a defensive restructuring of the kingdom, decided to strengthen some castles, including the repair of Civitella in 1269.

Between the 12th and 13th centuries, the fortress saw an increase in its inhabitants, from thirty in 1269 to sixty in 1271. In 1273, advanced ammunition and siege engines were brought there for the conquest of Castel Manfrino.
A document from 1276, during Angevin domination, refers to a castle as "just built," probably indicating information about consolidation or renewal works of Swabian constructions.

Two parchments, kept in the Ascoli State Archive, confirm that after 1387, 13 probivi (governing officials) of Civitella publicly assembled and appointed two ambassadors to be sent to Ascoli to negotiate with the local "Council of Elders" to place their homeland under "obedience, protection, and defense" of the city jurisdiction. A document from 1426 validates the payment of compensation "to four master carpenters and two transporters from Ascoli" for transferring a bombard to the fortress.

Around the mid-15th century, in 1442, control of the castle passed from the Angevins to the Aragonese. Alfonso I ordered the strengthening and expansion of the fortification, and by 1450, the defensive complex had its five towers. During these years, modifications were made with the installation of protective structures erected at the eastern end of the fortress, giving the site the appearance of a "fortified citadel of the early Renaissance."

In the years that followed, the people of Civitella did not always have optimal relations with the castle commanders. They petitioned King Ferrante I of Aragon for the removal of Commander Leone Gazull with a formal request in 1475. In 1481, the University of Civitella raised funds to restore the walls of the Terra, while in 1485, Alfonso d'Aragona, Duke of Calabria, inspected the fortress. Four of the five towers of the fortress were destroyed by the people of Civitella in 1495 due to widespread discontent and "to avoid the insolence of the castle inhabitants."

Odet de Foix, commanding French troops, occupied Civitella in February 1528, when the fortification had only one tower suitable for defense, with the other four not yet rebuilt. These were repaired in the following years, and by 1557, the restored fortress was ready to withstand the assault of the War of the Tronto. In 1557, it endured a siege led by the Duke of Guisa and Antonio Carafa.

In 1734, the Bourbons established themselves as the new rulers of the fortress, replacing the previous Habsburg sovereignty, making new structural modifications that allowed the fortification to resist French and Piedmontese sieges.

In 1798 and 1806, it endured sieges by French troops during Napoleon Bonaparte's Italian campaign, damaging the structures to the point that in 1820, the fortress was completely restored while maintaining its Renaissance character. The last siege, most notable in historical chronicles, occurred between 1860 and 1861 and marked the beginning of the end of the garrison's function.

These vicissitudes led to the cessation of the fortress's function, followed by a long period of abandonment and progressive dismantling of the defensive complex. There were also thefts, carried out by the Civitella inhabitants who used the ruins "as a quarry for construction materials."

Significant restoration work was undertaken from 1975 to 1985, sponsored by the Superintendent of Fine Arts of L'Aquila, the Cassa del Mezzogiorno, and the local municipal administration. This not only largely restored the use of the fortress and its premises but also preserved its character as a fortified citadel of the early Renaissance, particularly significant for its historical, cultural, and military importance.

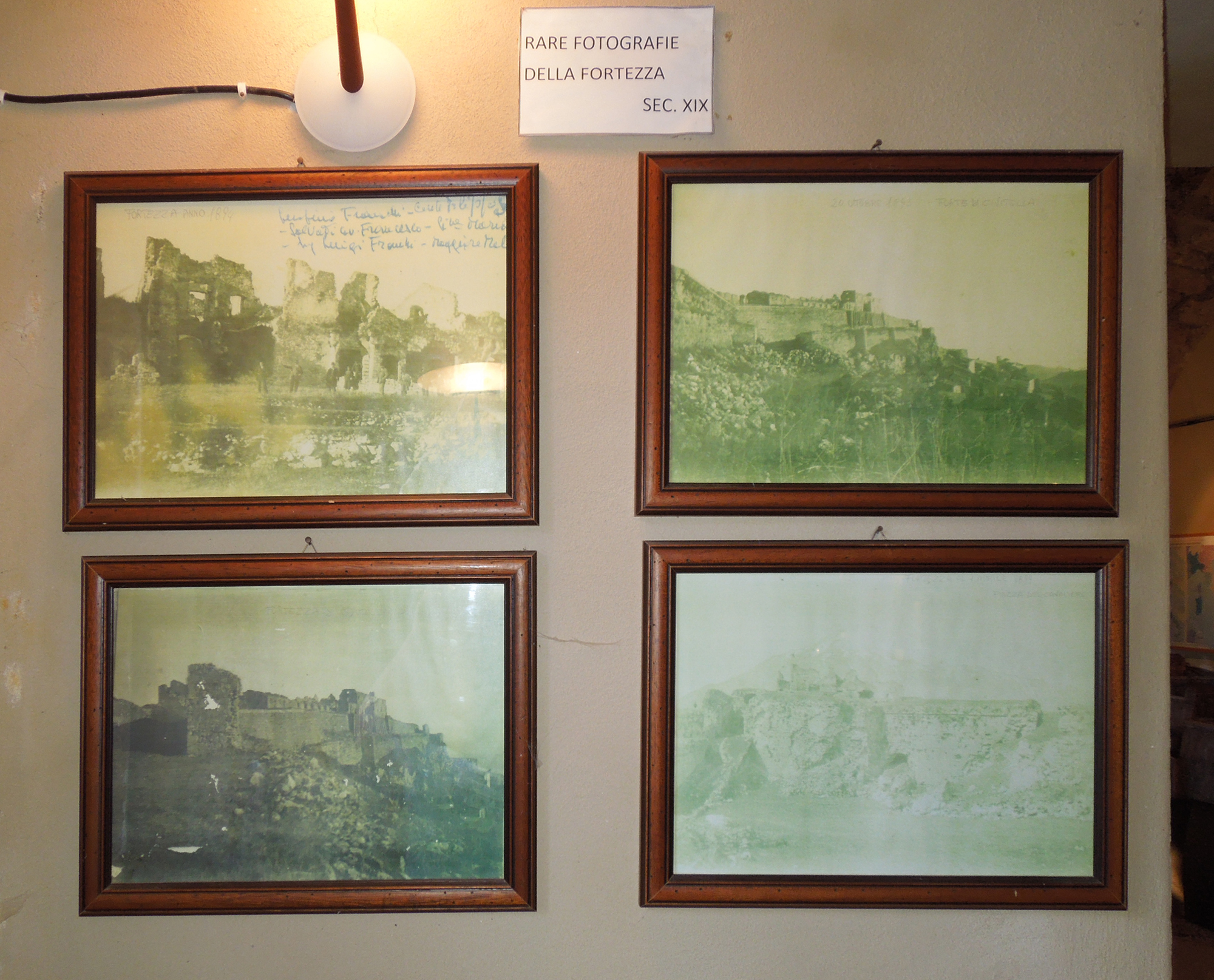
Photographs of the fortress exhibited in the Museum of Arms.

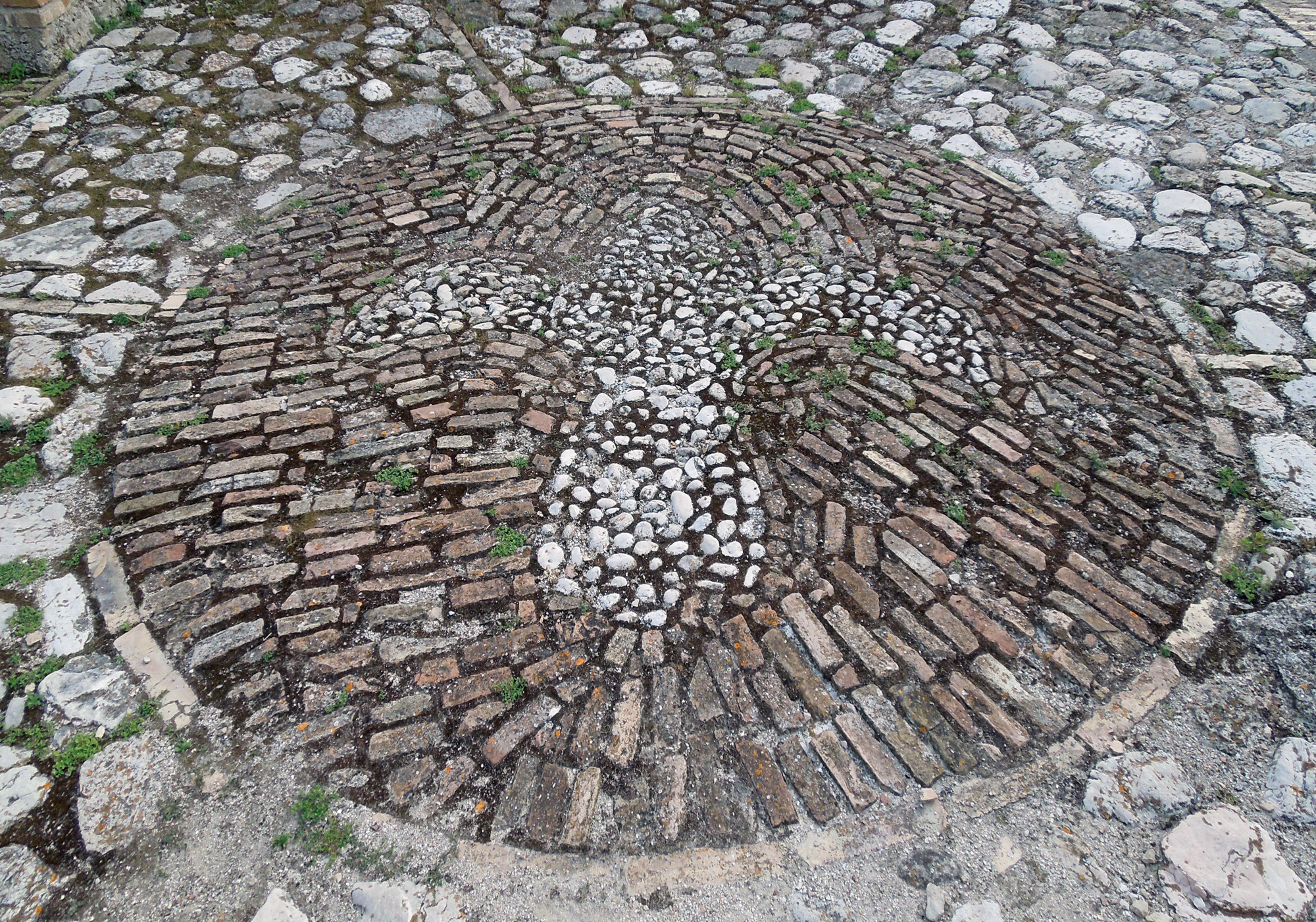
Lily, symbol of the Kingdom of Naples, in the internal pavement.

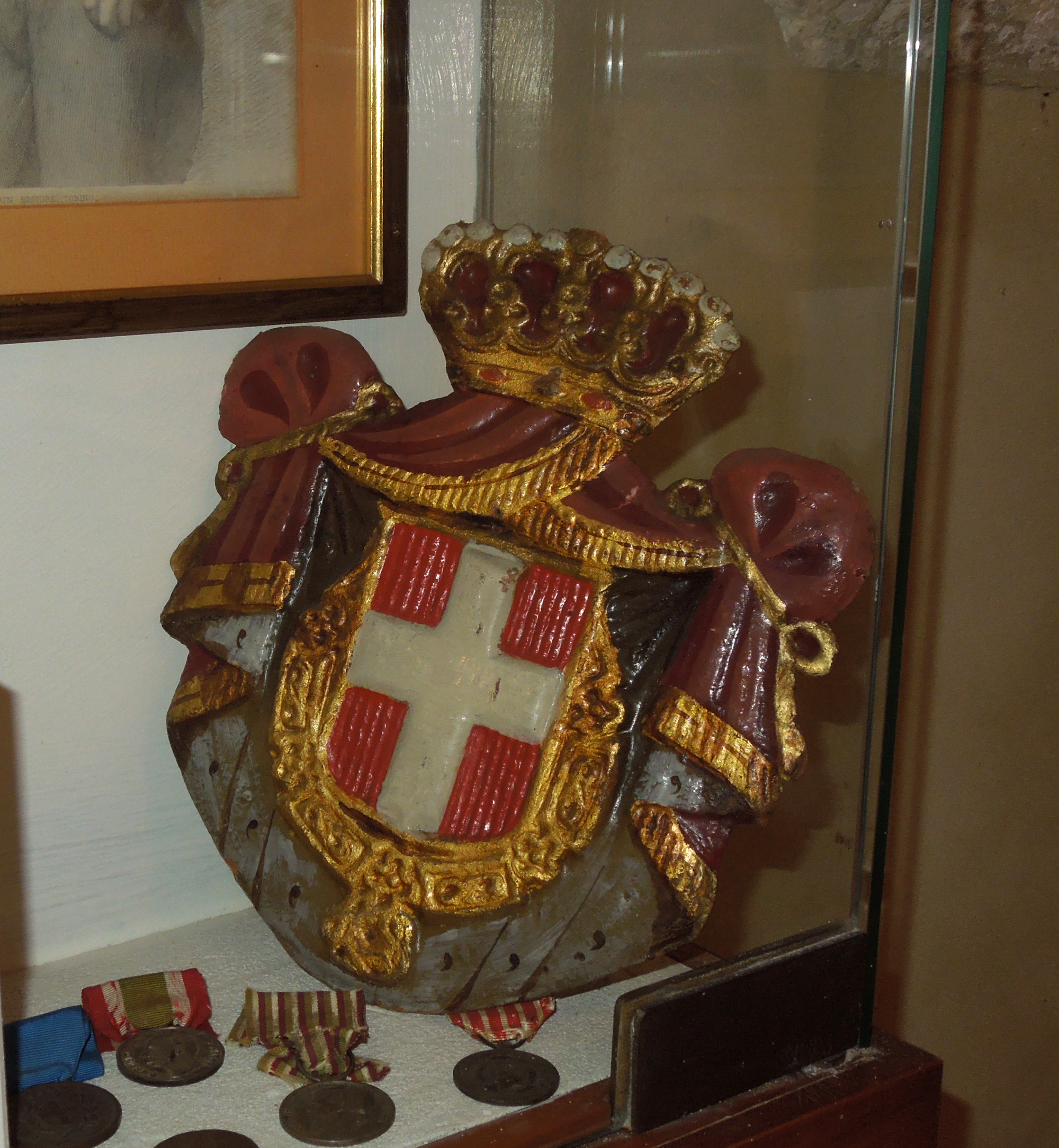
FERT of House of Savoy at the Museum of Arms.

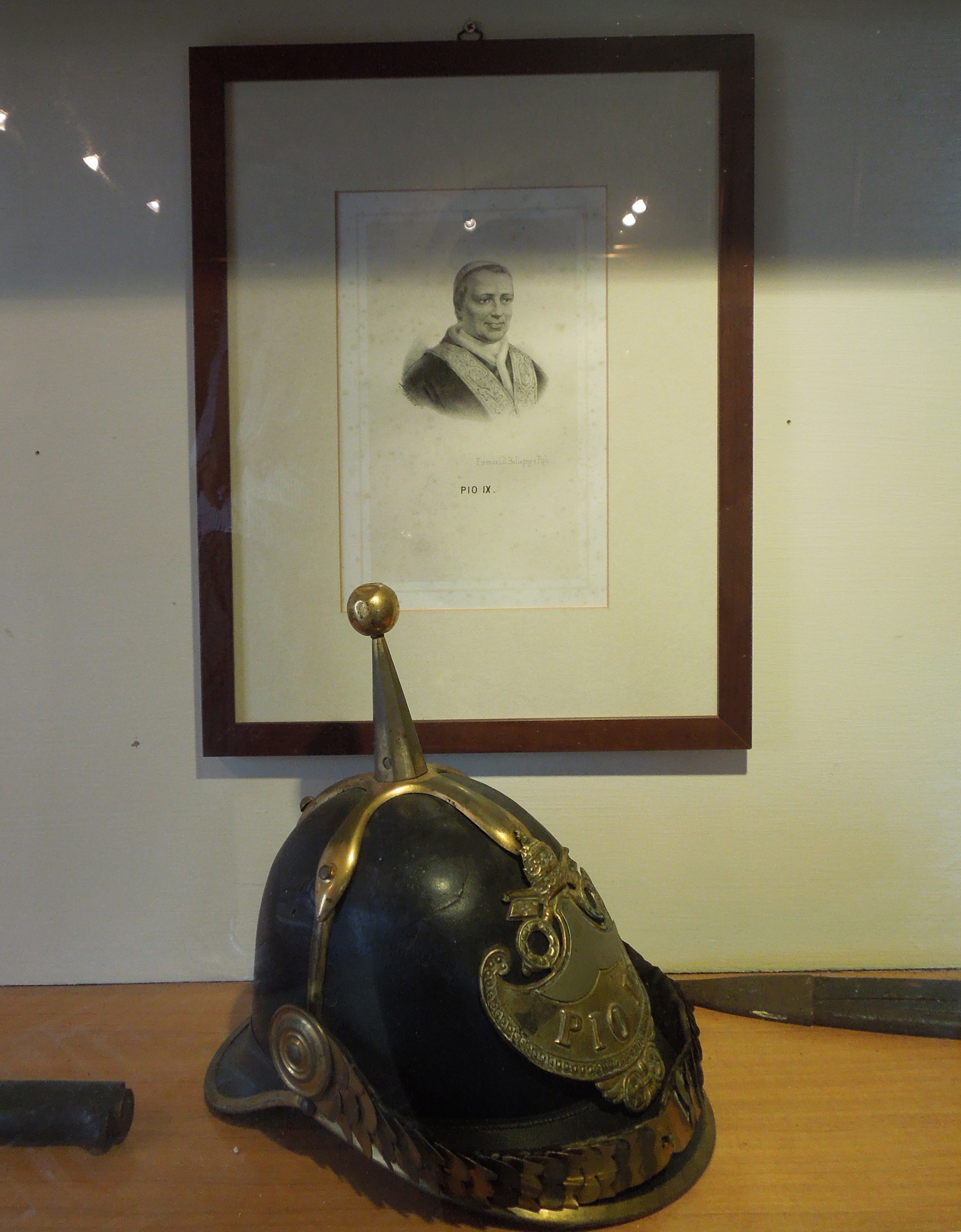
Papal helmet from 1848, belonged to Pio IX's troops, at the Museum of Arms.

== Sieges ==
=== Siege of 1557 ===
French troops commanded by Duke of Guise Francesco I di Lorena, general of Enrico II, allied with Pope Paul IV and Antonio Carafa, Marquis of Montebello, nephew of Pope Paul IV, subjected the pre-existing castle to a fierce siege beginning on April 24, 1557, and concluding on May 16 of the same year. This military episode underscored the strategic importance of the site. The strengthened fortification successfully withstood the assailants.

Three perspective plans from engravings of the siege camp provide a good approximation of the fortress's structure at that time. The complex appeared enclosed on three sides by crenellated walls punctuated, at regular intervals, by five crenellated towers with projecting works, all in excellent condition. The eastern side features curtain walls, partly without crenellation, walkways, a tower with a scarp base, and a bastion guarding the entrance. Beyond the entrance gate are depicted the oldest structures, enclosed within the walls.

=== Siege of 1798 ===
The siege of 1798 concluded during the night between December 7 and 8 of the same year, when command of the garrison was handed over to the French under Giovanni Battista Rusca by the military governor Giovanni Lacombe.

Siege of 1806 On January 22, 1806, the French army again besieged the fortress. Commanding the Civitella stronghold was Irish military officer Matteo Wade, in service to the Kingdom of Naples army. Wade had a contingent of 19 cannons, a mortar, 323 men, and provisions to withstand three months. He rejected surrender demands from French generals, who bombarded the fort and captured it on May 21.

=== Siege of 1860–1861 ===
The siege of 1860–1861 was led by Lieutenant Colonel Antonio Curci, with 400 garibaldini volunteers, and Navy Major Renzo Carozzi commanding another 400 men. Major Luigi Ascione led 430 men within the fortress. The siege lasted from October 26, 1860, to March 20, 1861, with the Bourbon militias surrendering three days after the proclamation of the Kingdom of Italy.

== Architecture ==
There are no traces of the layout of the older defensive urban fortress construction. It is hypothesized, however, that it had a fortified core enclosed within a city wall.
The fortification gained substantial form during the Swabian period and later under the rule of the Angevins, owing to its strategic position near the border between the Kingdom of Naples and the emerging Papal States.

From 1564, the structure of the fort underwent modifications and expansions to achieve its current configuration, as ordered by the King of Spain and Naples, Philip II of Habsburg, who reinforced the earlier Angevin fortifications and the Aragonese fortress.

The Angevins, aiming to adapt and modernize the pre-existing Swabian constructions to fit their military strategies and techniques, added circular flanking towers at the corners and along the straight walls, possibly crenellated and equipped with projecting apparatuses typical of the late Middle Ages, serving as breaches, remnants of which are still visible.

In the period leading up to the Siege of the War of the Two Trontos in 1557, recalled in chronicles and engravings of the surrounding camp, the fortification walls were shaped according to the principles of modern fortification and were equipped with bastions, reinforcements, and counterscarps, as required for the use of firearms.
From 1639 to 1711, the settlement underwent maintenance work aimed solely at repairs and improvements.

The current fortress is a complex defensive structure designed to meet technical and functional needs. It comprises architectures from various periods organized on different levels, interconnected by 19th-century ramps. Its ensemble is built on an elliptical plan covering the entire summit area of the hill, predominantly made of squared blocks of travertine and housing extensive parade grounds, battlements, covered walkways, trenches, bastions, the Carmine battery, punishment cells like the "Cocodrillo Dungeon" of Aragonese origin water cisterns, stables, offices, smithies, soldier and officer quarters, munitions depots, mess halls and kitchens, a bakery, a chapel dedicated to Saint Barbara, patron saint of artillerymen, a church, and a residential palace.

Architecturally, it can be divided into two parts: one allocated for residential use and the other for defensive purposes. The latter is concentrated on the eastern side of the fortification, more exposed to attacks, as the hill is naturally less rugged there. This side features various terraces and the two defensive bastions of San Pietro and Sant'Andrea.
Additional protective barriers included three covered walkways, acting as funnels through which attackers had to pass if they wished to conquer the fortress. Defense was aided by a ditch topped by a partially drawbridge and substantial guard groups who, from the arrow slits, controlled the access ramps to the fortress square.

Access to the interior is from the east, at the lower level, from the flank of the San Pietro bastion, where there was a guard post surrounded by the moat with the drawbridge.

At the highest point of the fortress, behind the church, is the Gran Strada, where the ruins of soldiers' and non-commissioned officers' lodgings and the bakery remain. There are also paths leading to the western tip of the complex, where the Carmine Chapel once stood.

The walkway on the western slope provides an overview of the town of Civitella del Tronto and its unique urban layout, with groups of fortified houses arranged parallel, traversed by ascending longitudinal streets connected via narrow bends, and with transversal routes consisting of ramps and stairways. This road system forms elongated longitudinal blocks, creating a series of outer defenses for the fortress.

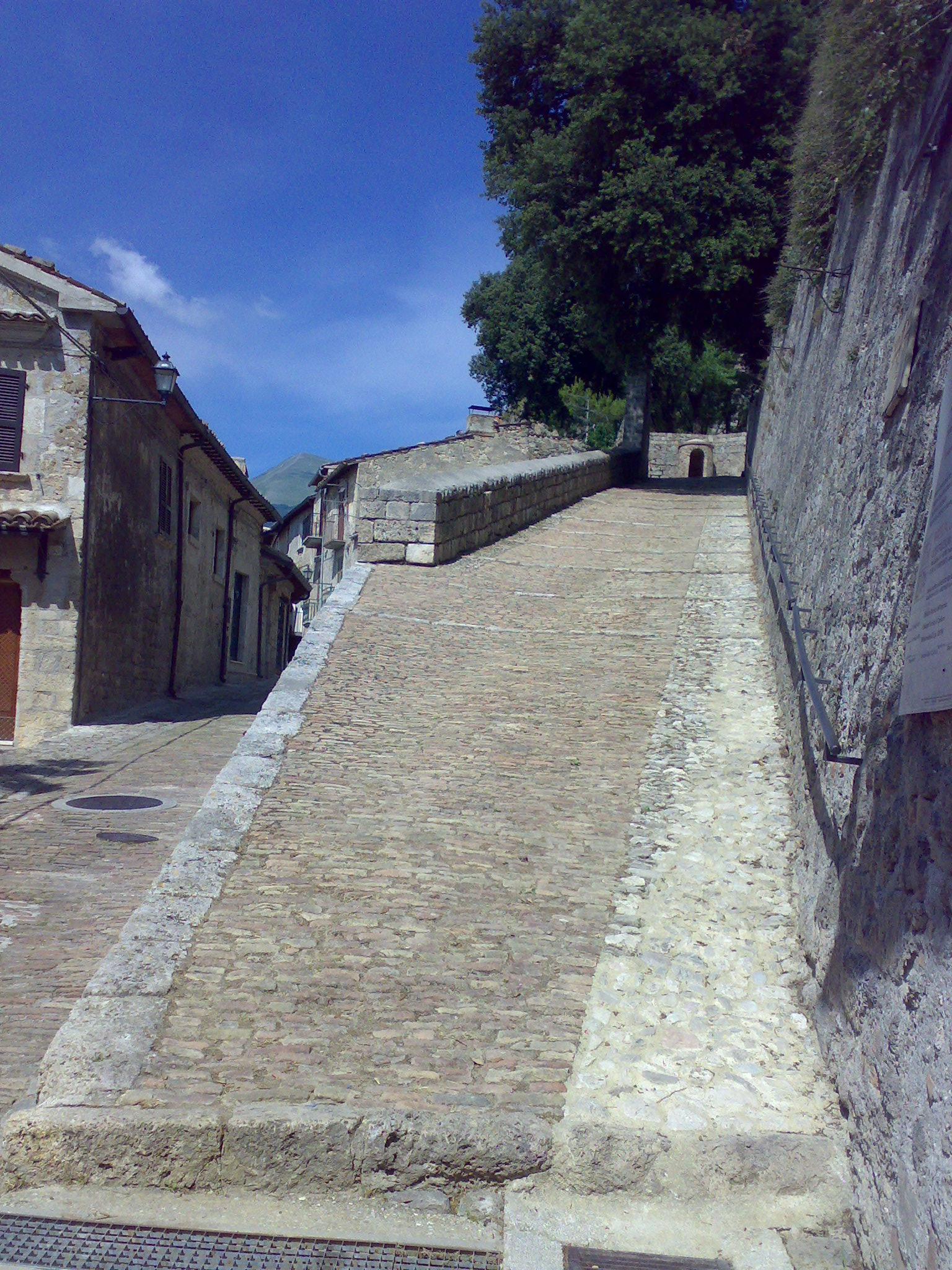
Access ramp to the fortress.

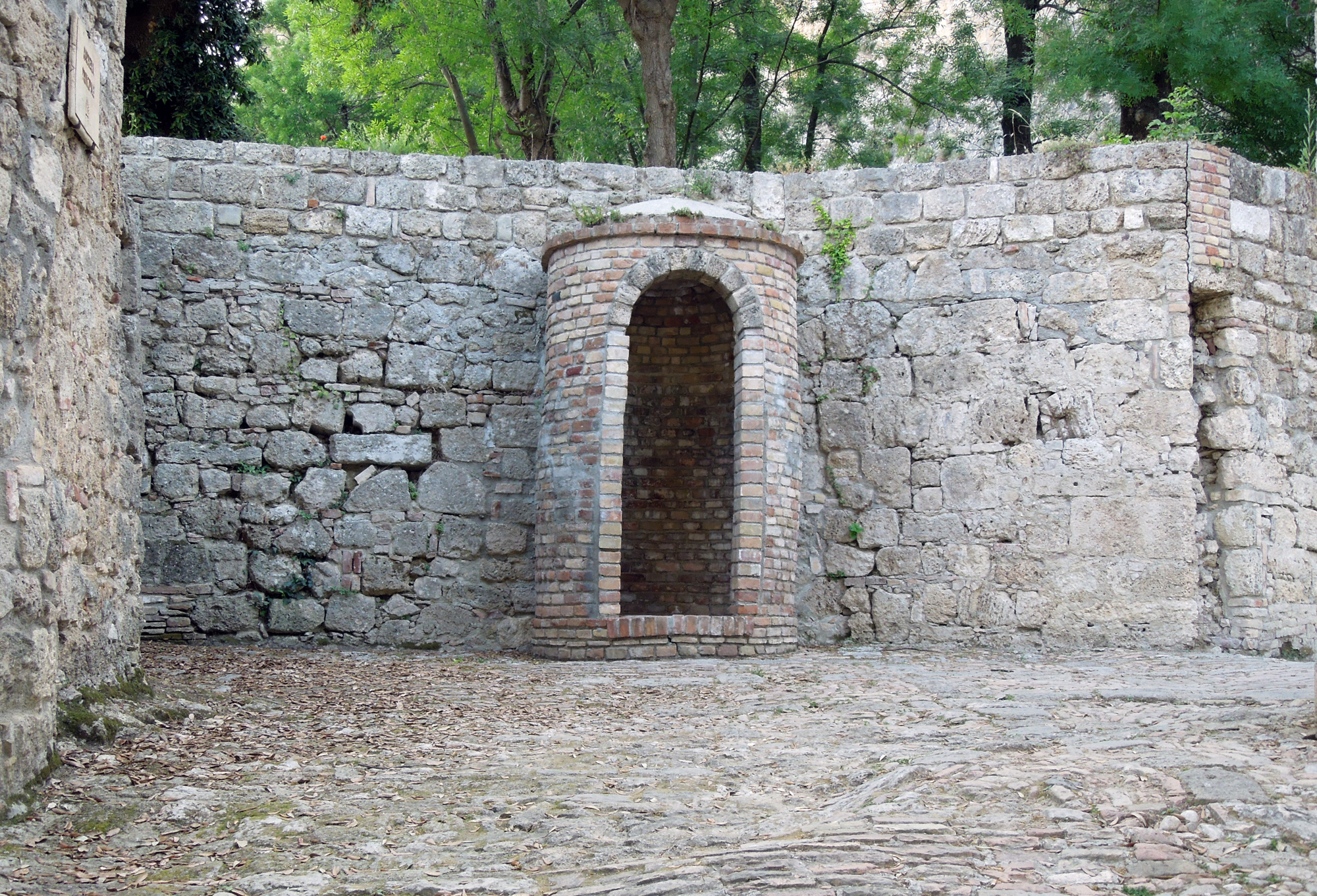
First guard post.

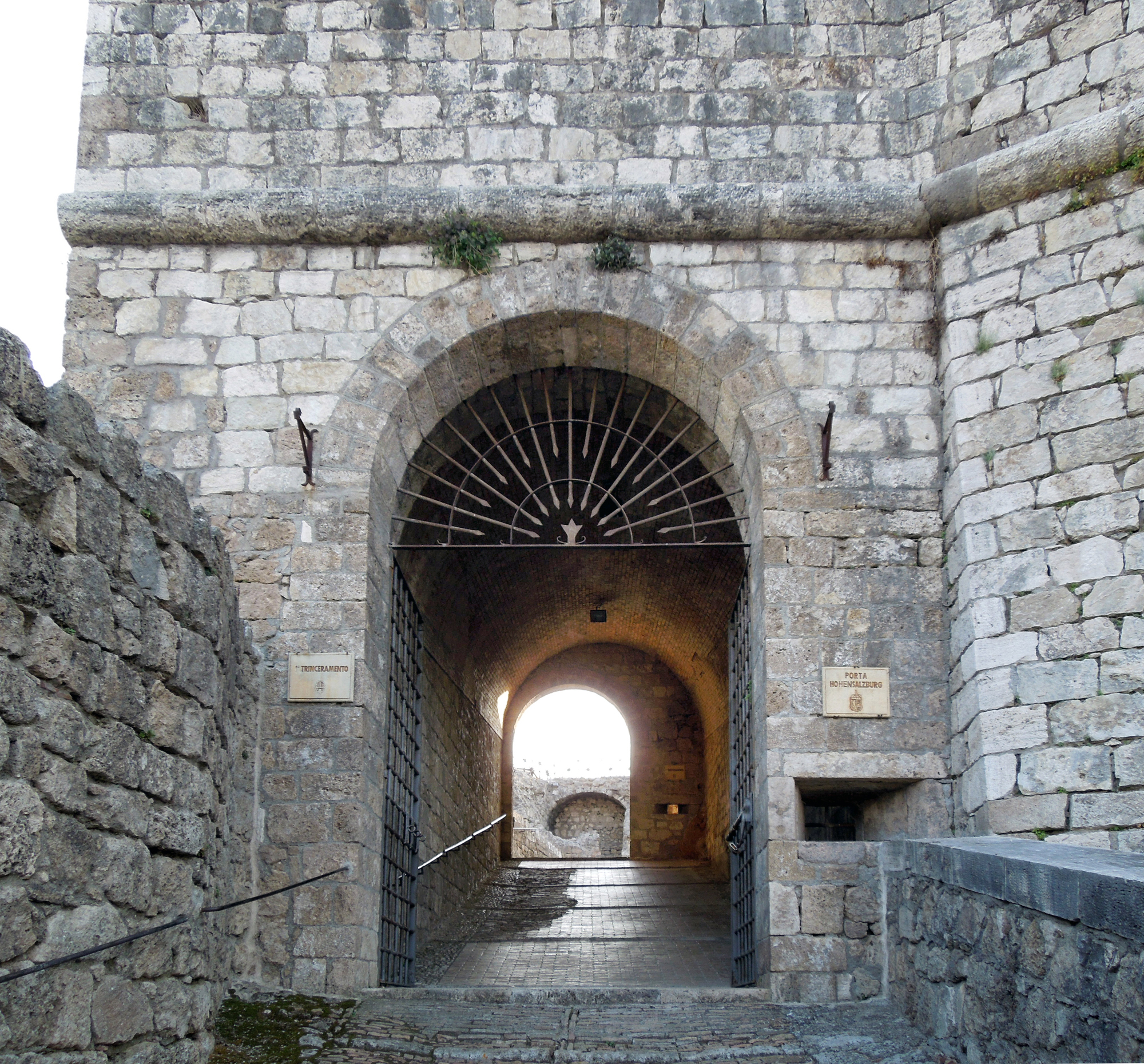
Porta Hohensalzburg.

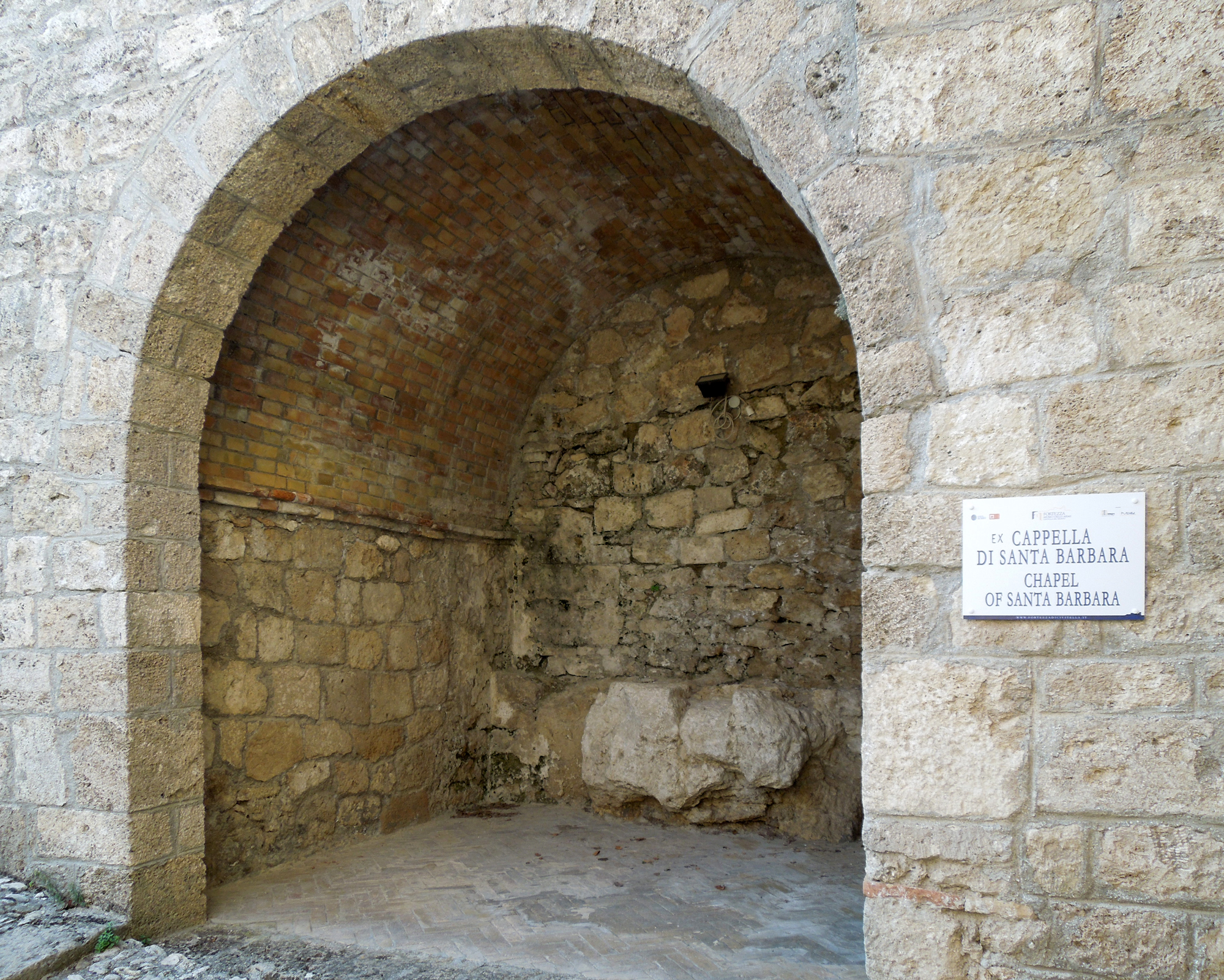
Chapel of Santa Barbara.

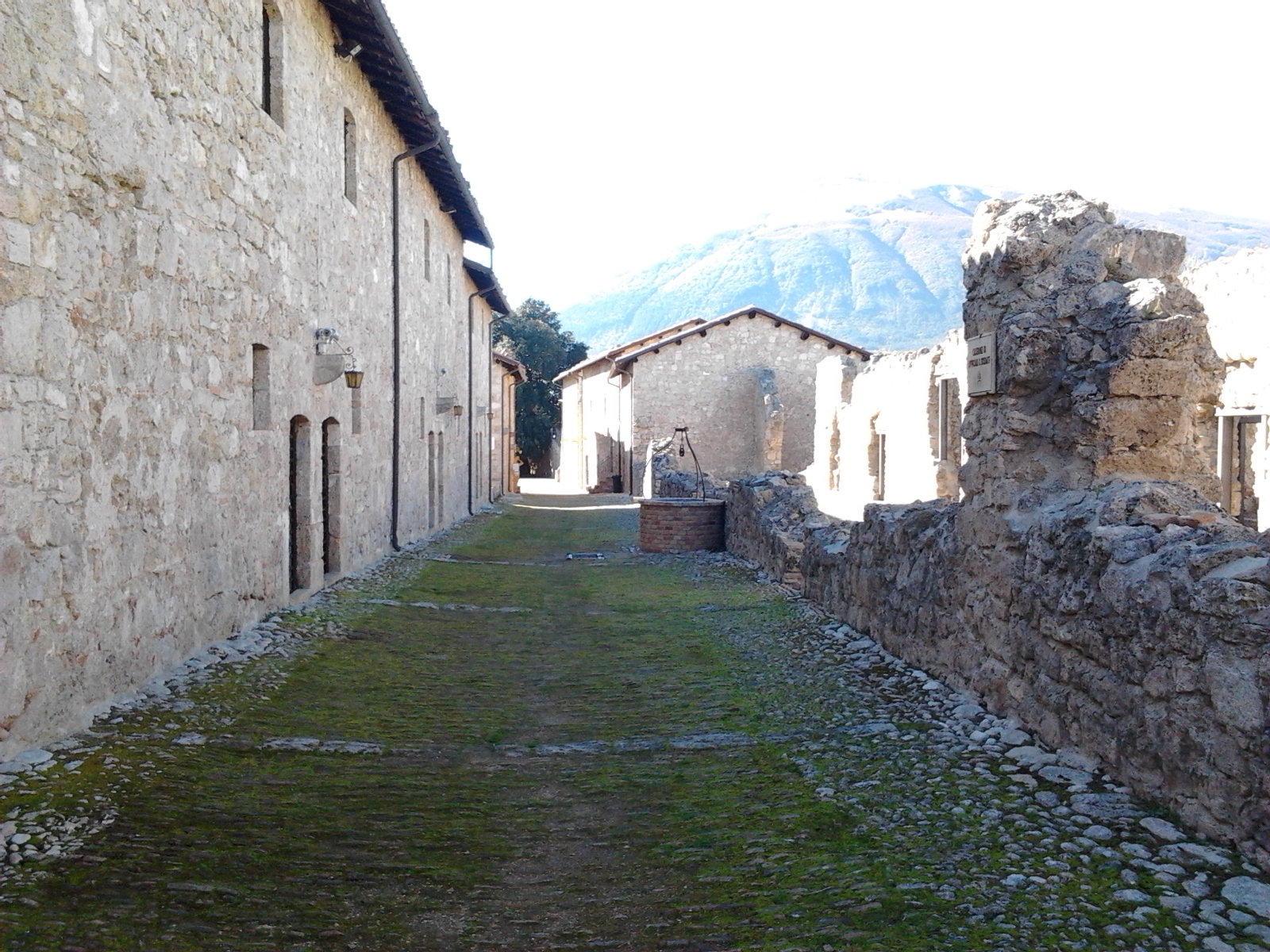
Gran Strada, ancient residential area inside the fortress.

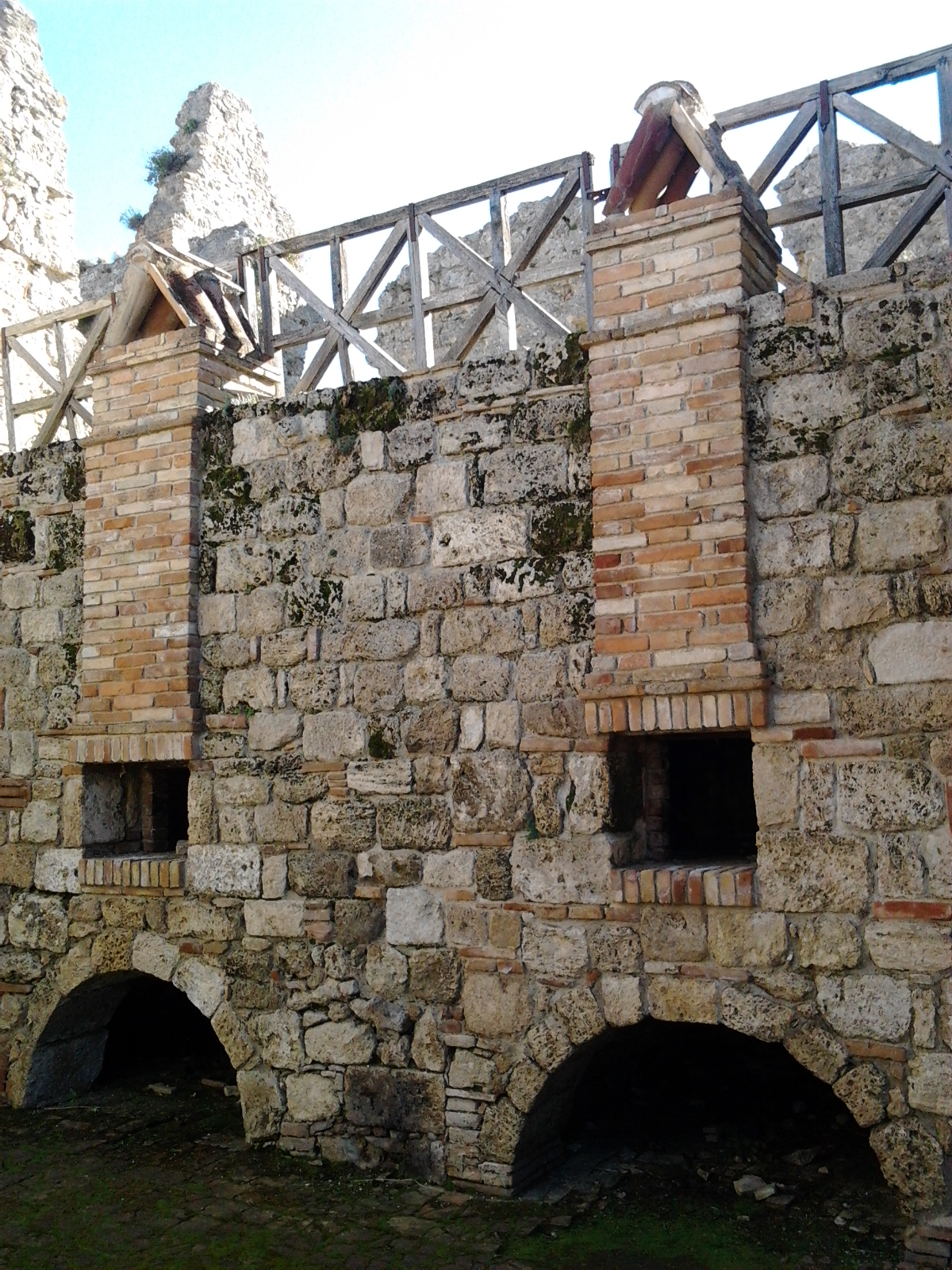
Remains of the bakery.

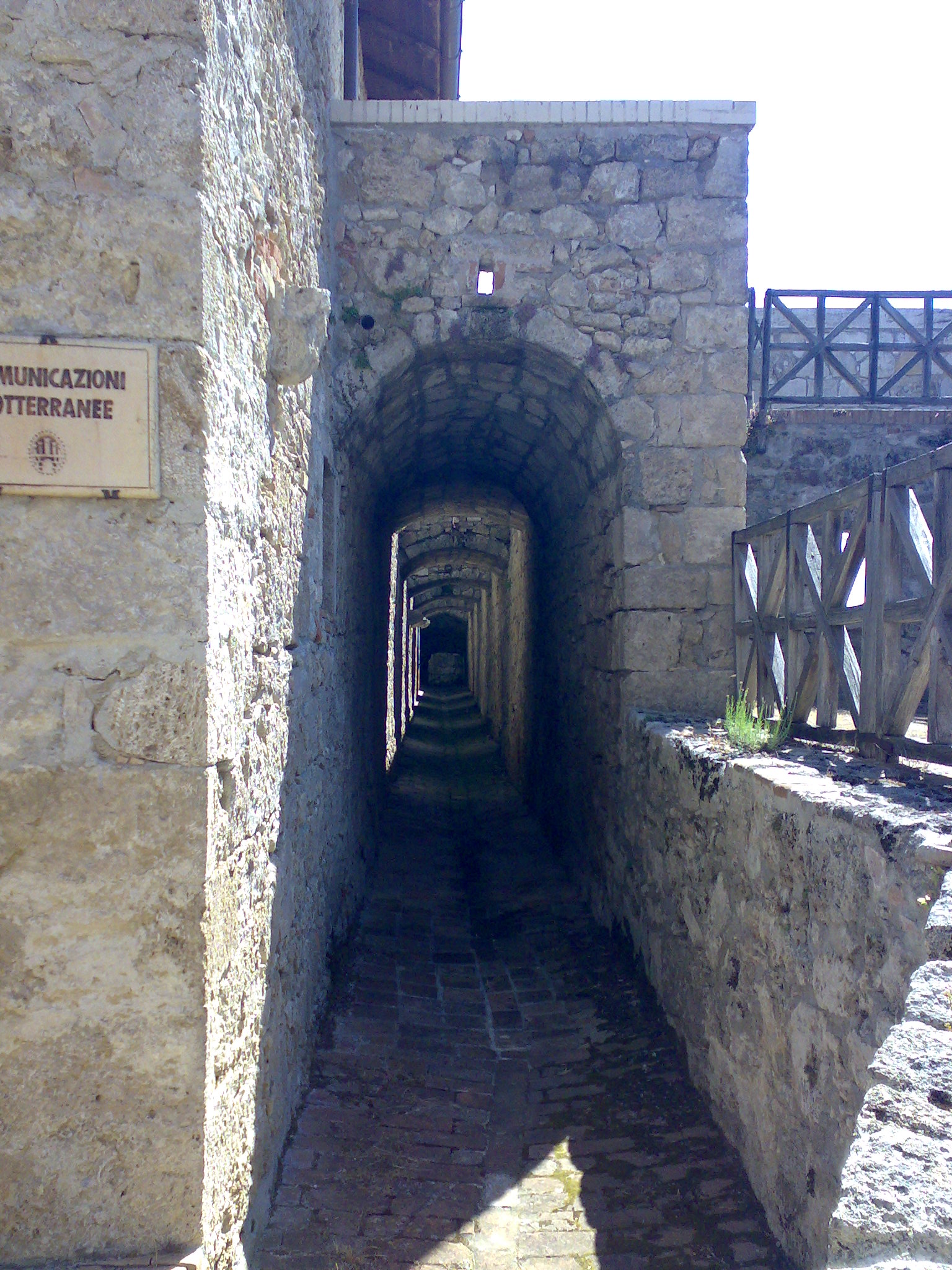
Sewer system.

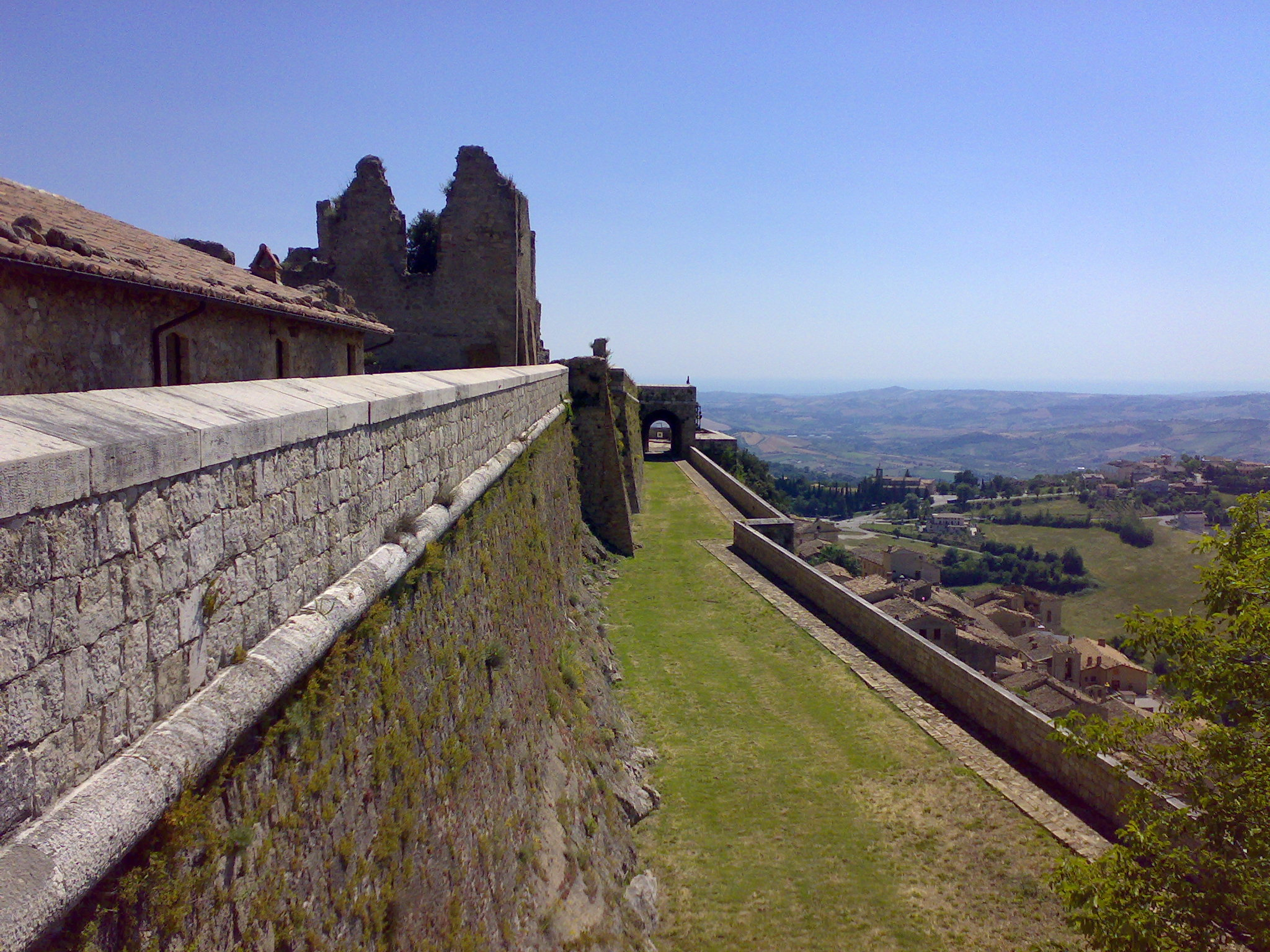
Fortress falsabraga observed from the southern covered walkway.

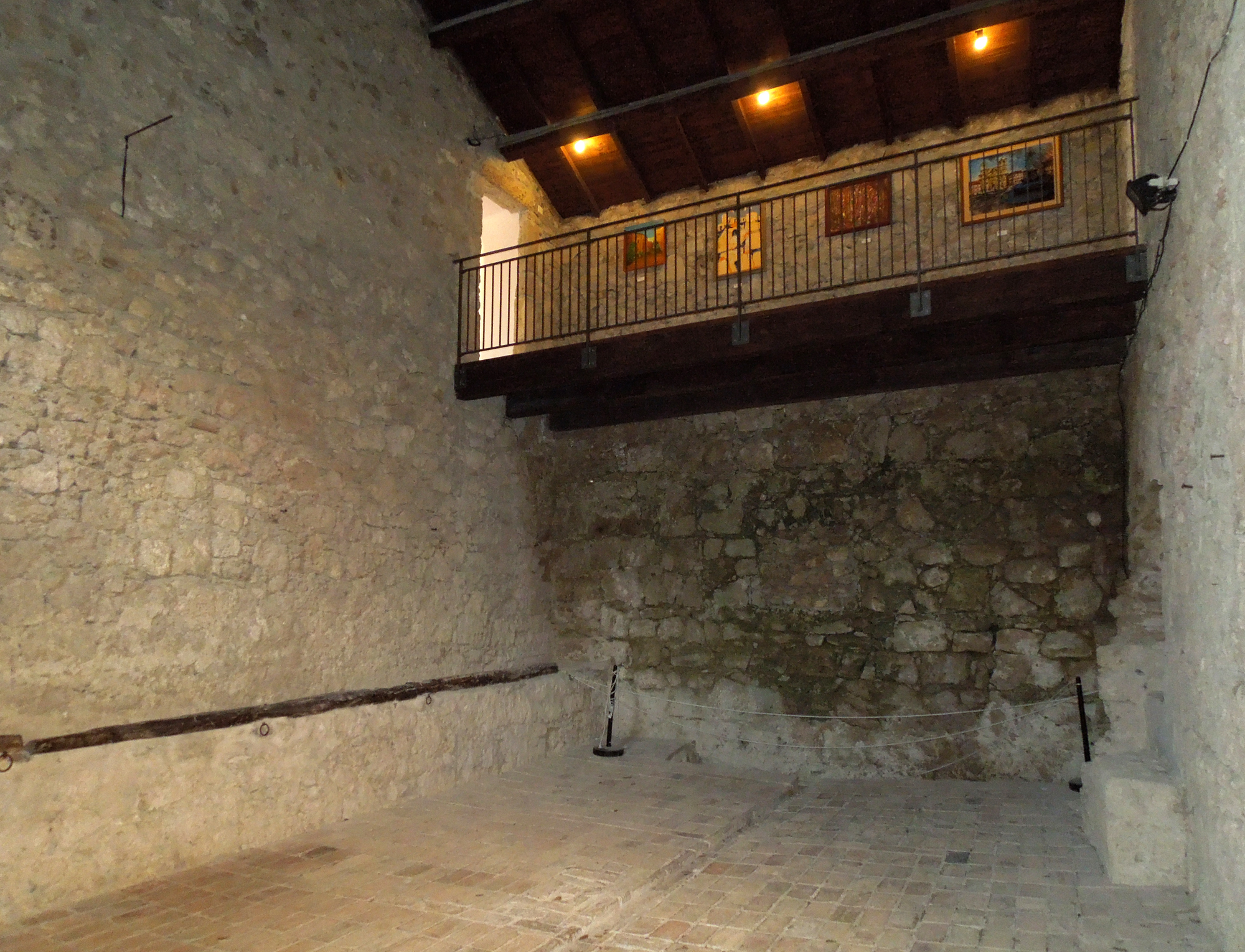
Interior of the stable.

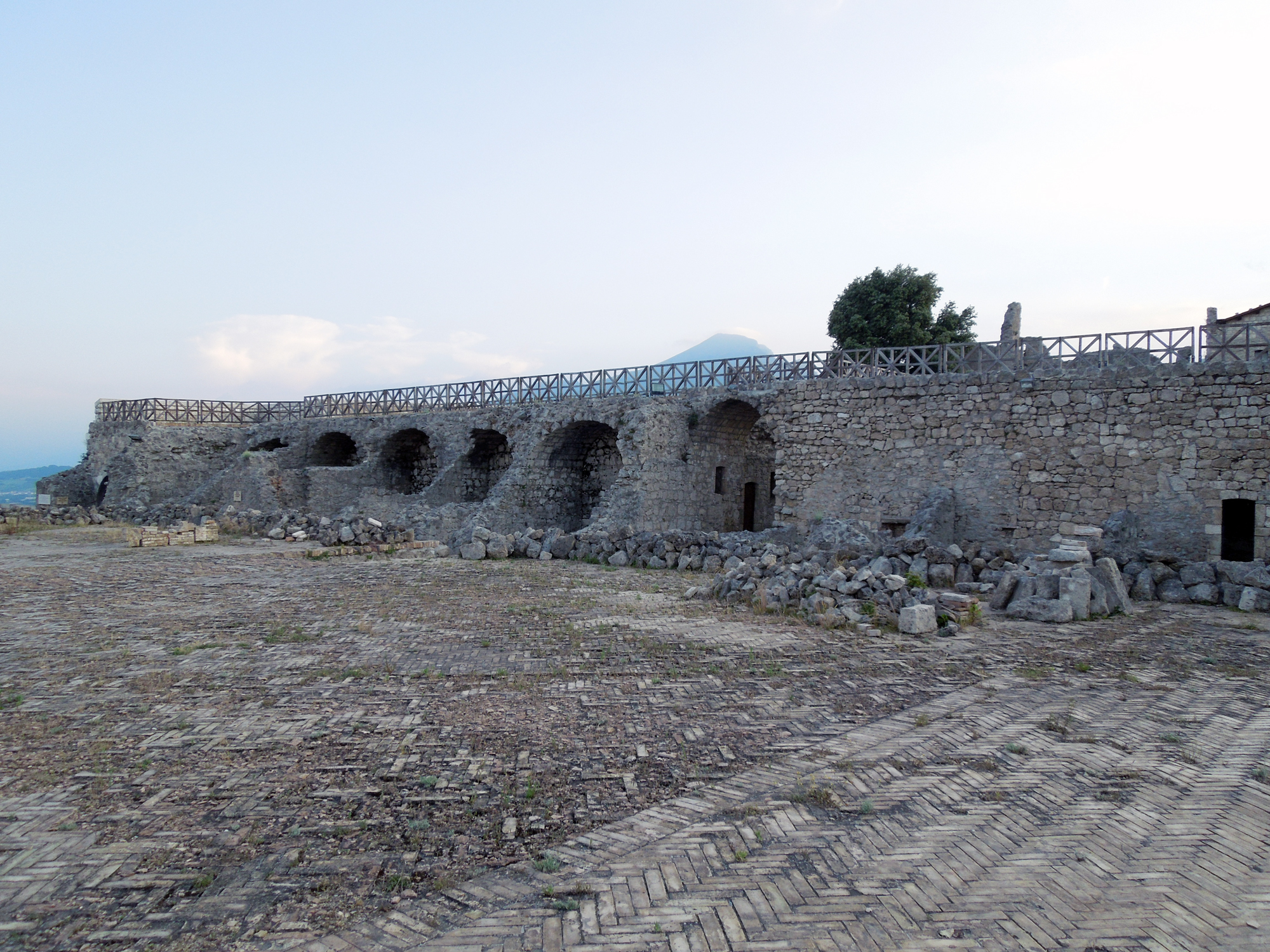
Ruins of internal lodgings.

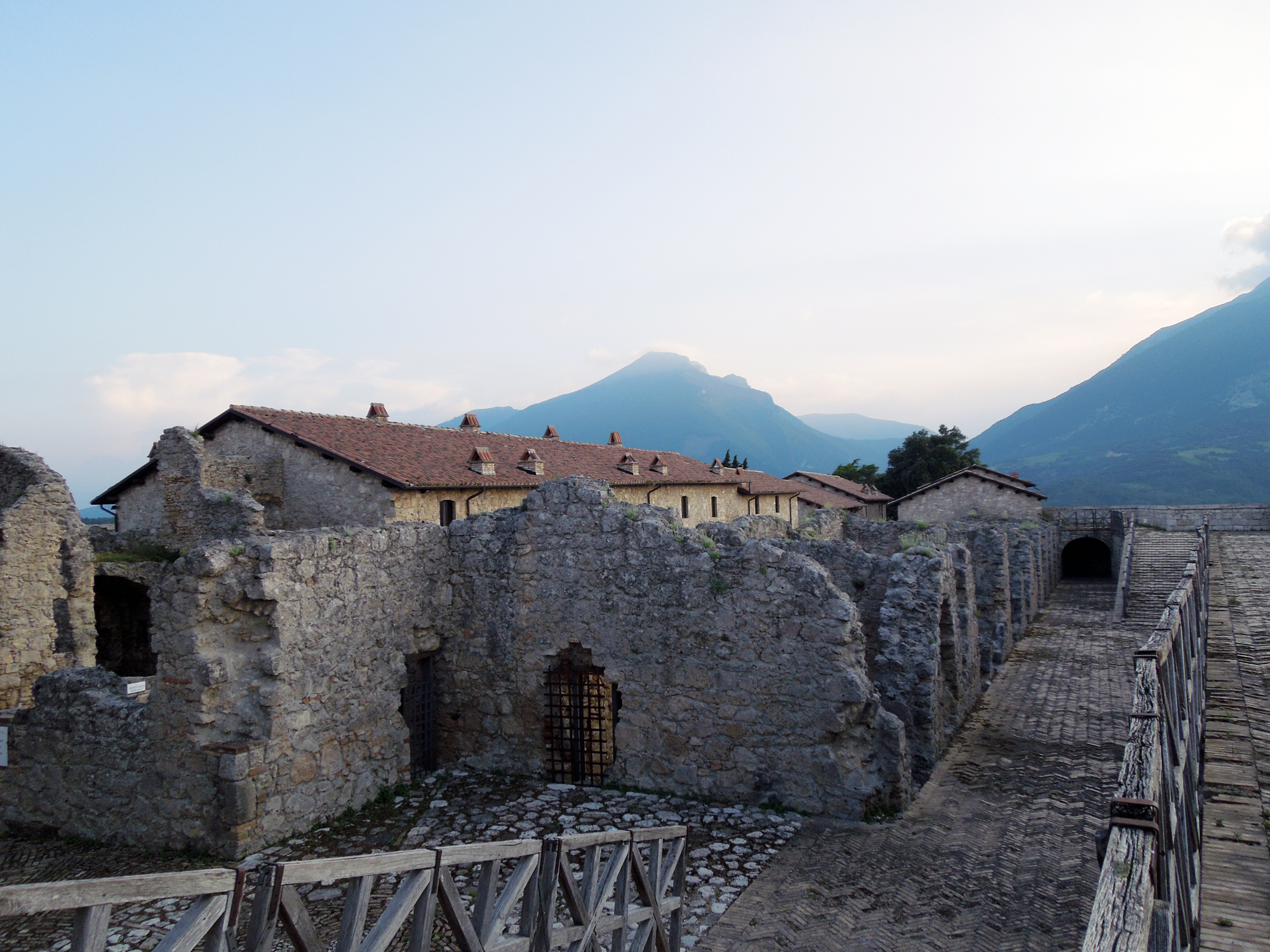
Internal ruins.

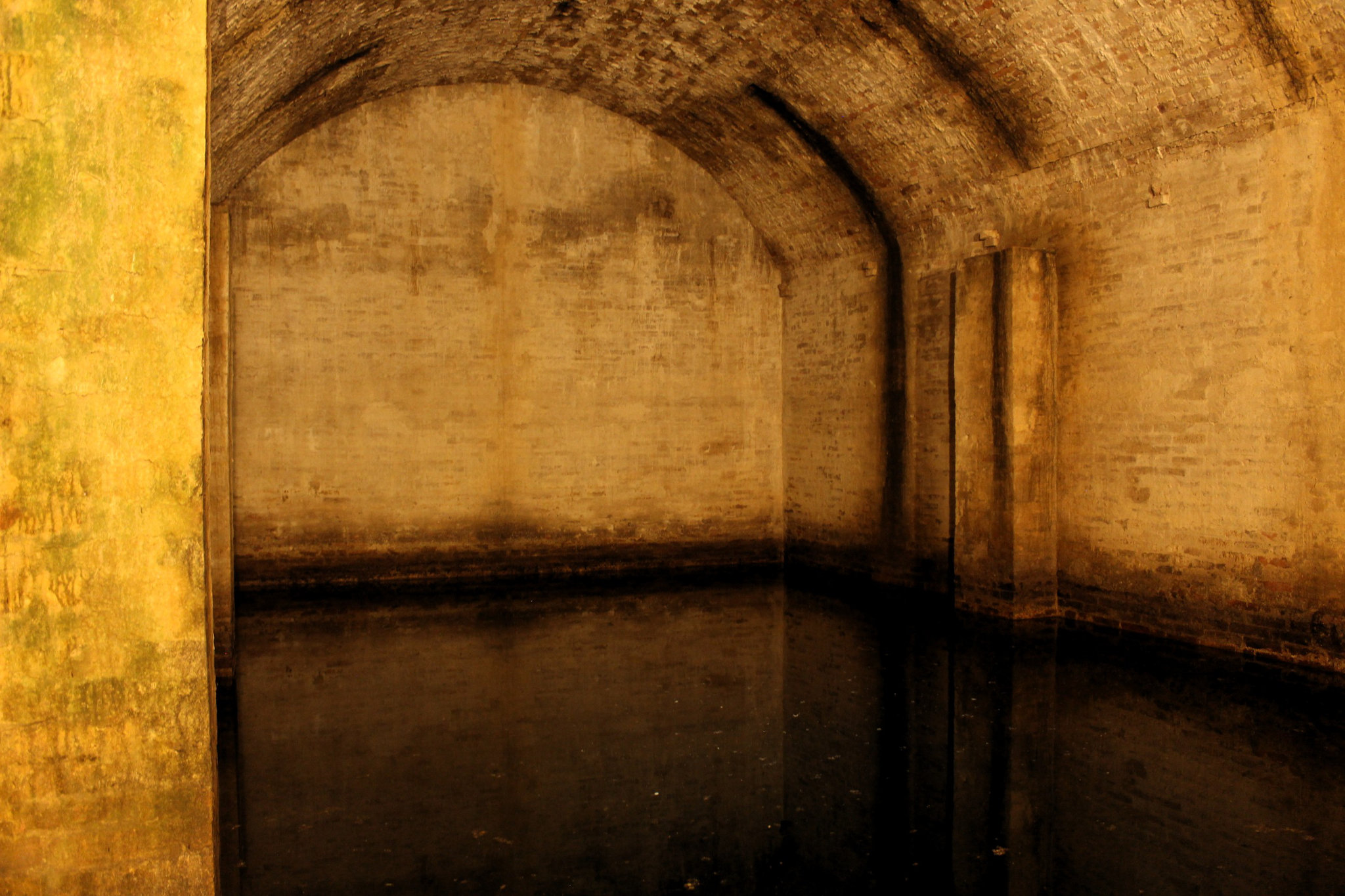
Water cistern.

=== Piazza del Cavaliere ===
It is the first parade ground upon entering the fortress. Located beyond the second covered walkway, it is protected by the bastions of Sant'Andrea and San Paolo. It is named "del Cavaliere" (of the Knight) because until 1861, it housed the funerary monument dedicated to the Irish Major Matteo Wade, who led the troops during the 1806 French siege. The marble work, erected in 1829 by Francesco I and executed by Tito Angelini, was relocated by the Piedmontese within the town of Civitella, where it remains to this day. This space was used during times of peace for troop training and currently serves as the entrance to a cistern.

Various events are organized here every year, particularly in summer. Until 2006, in August, it was the venue for a historical reenactment in period costume within the fortress, known as A la Corte de lo Governatore.

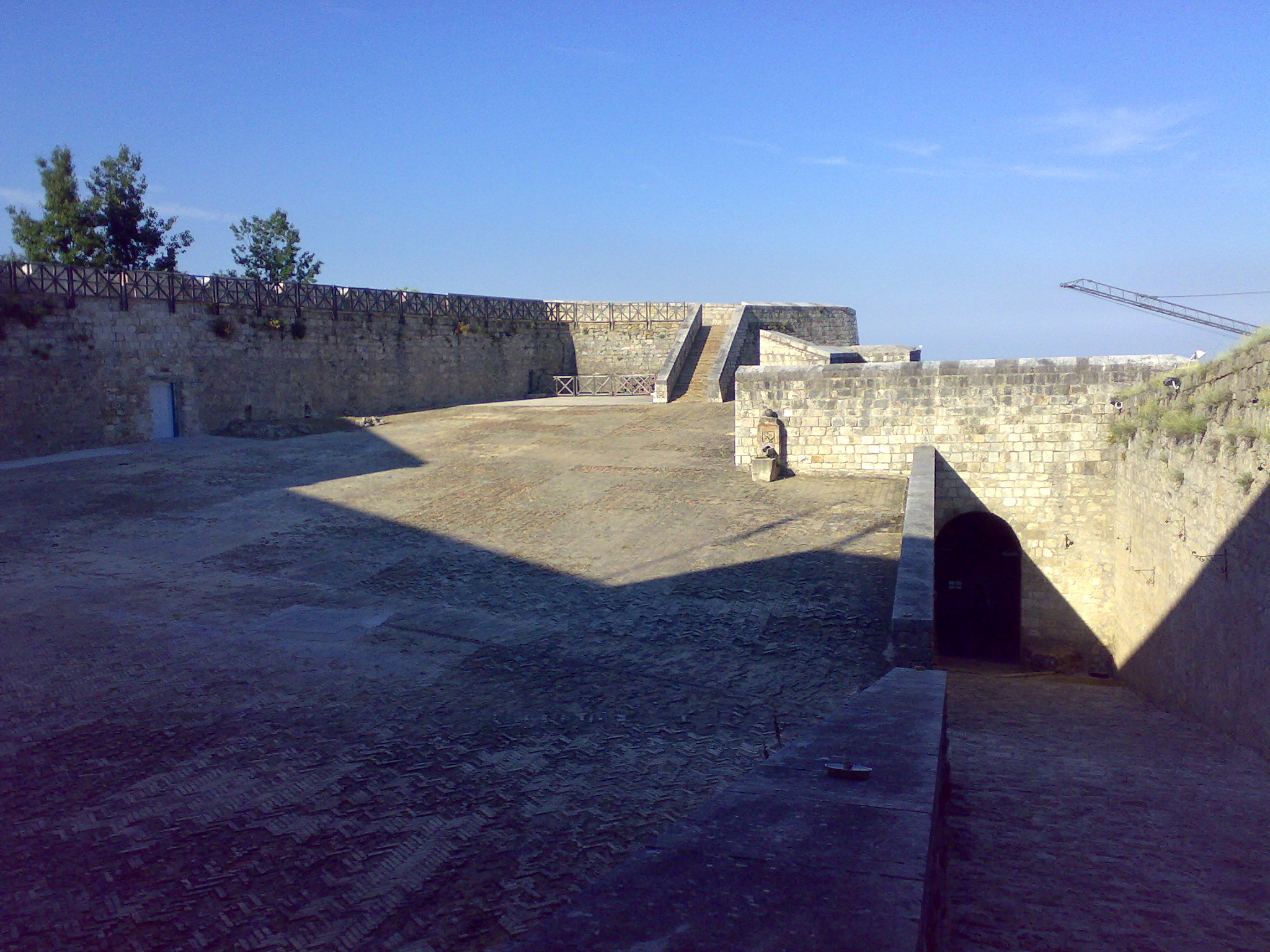
Piazza del Cavaliere.

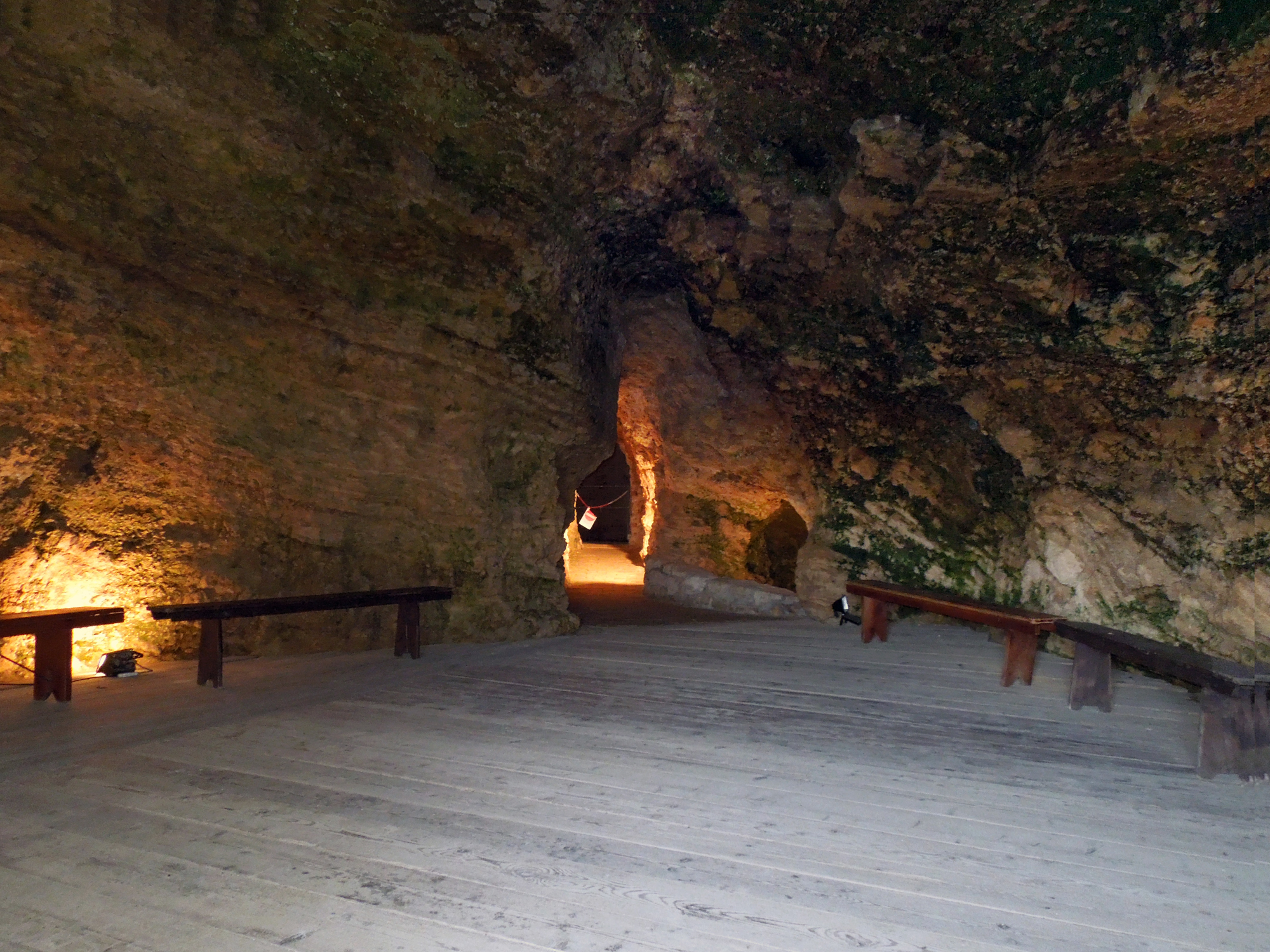
Entrance to the first cistern.

=== Piazza d'Armi ===
Beyond the third covered walkway lies the second parade ground of the fortress, called "Piazza d'Armi" (Parade Square), overlooked by the San Giovanni bastion and ruins of military lodgings. This space was used daily for the flag-raising ceremony.

During the Spanish domination period, the square underwent modifications to meet the water needs of the garrisons residing in the fortress. Beneath the floor level, one of the five large cisterns was constructed to collect and filter rainwater. The water was collected through a network of drainage channels and channeled into the central well. It would fall into the cistern after being filtered through layers of charcoal and gravel, accumulating in the reservoir.

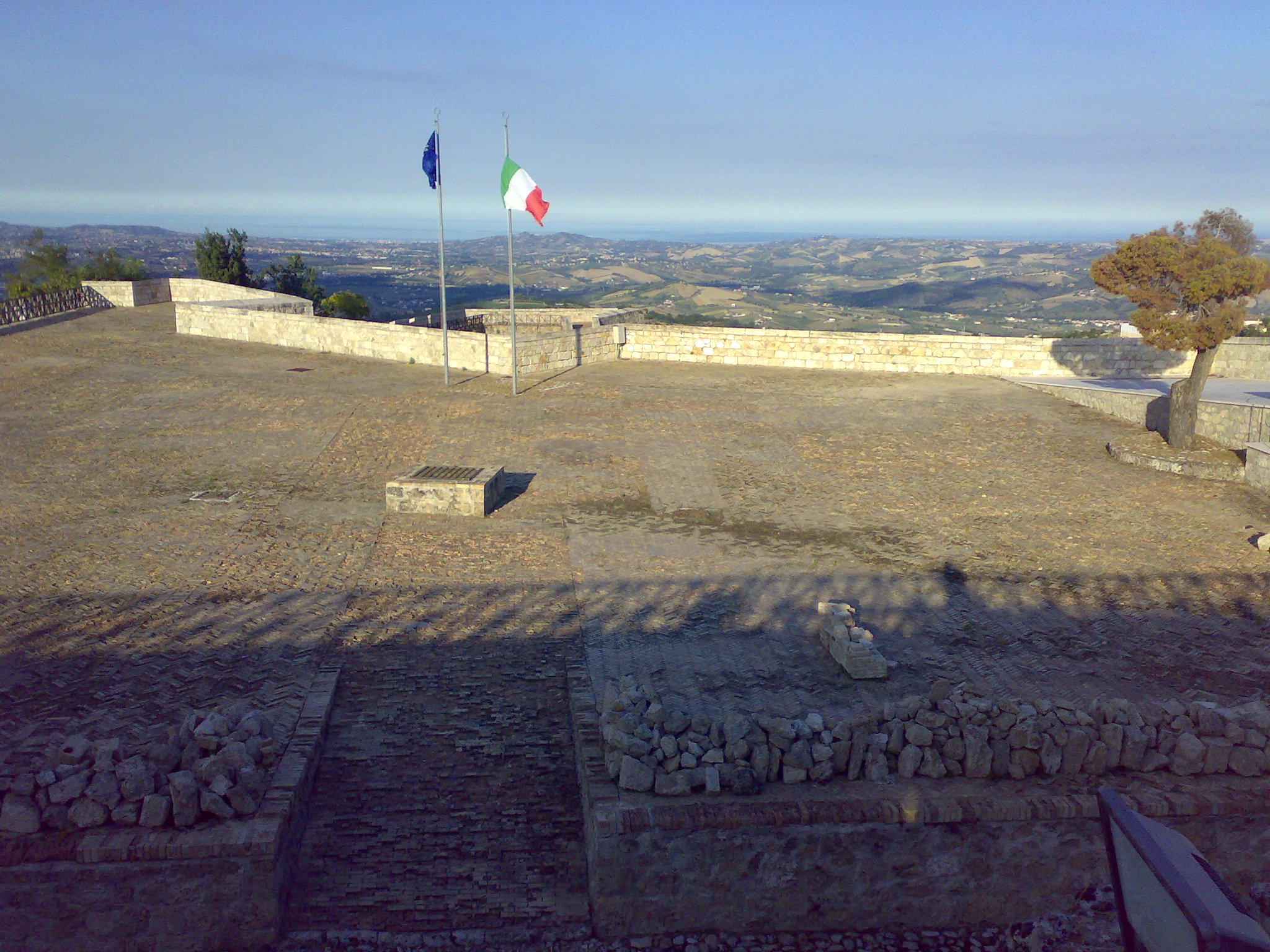
Piazza d'Armi as seen from the Gran Piazza.

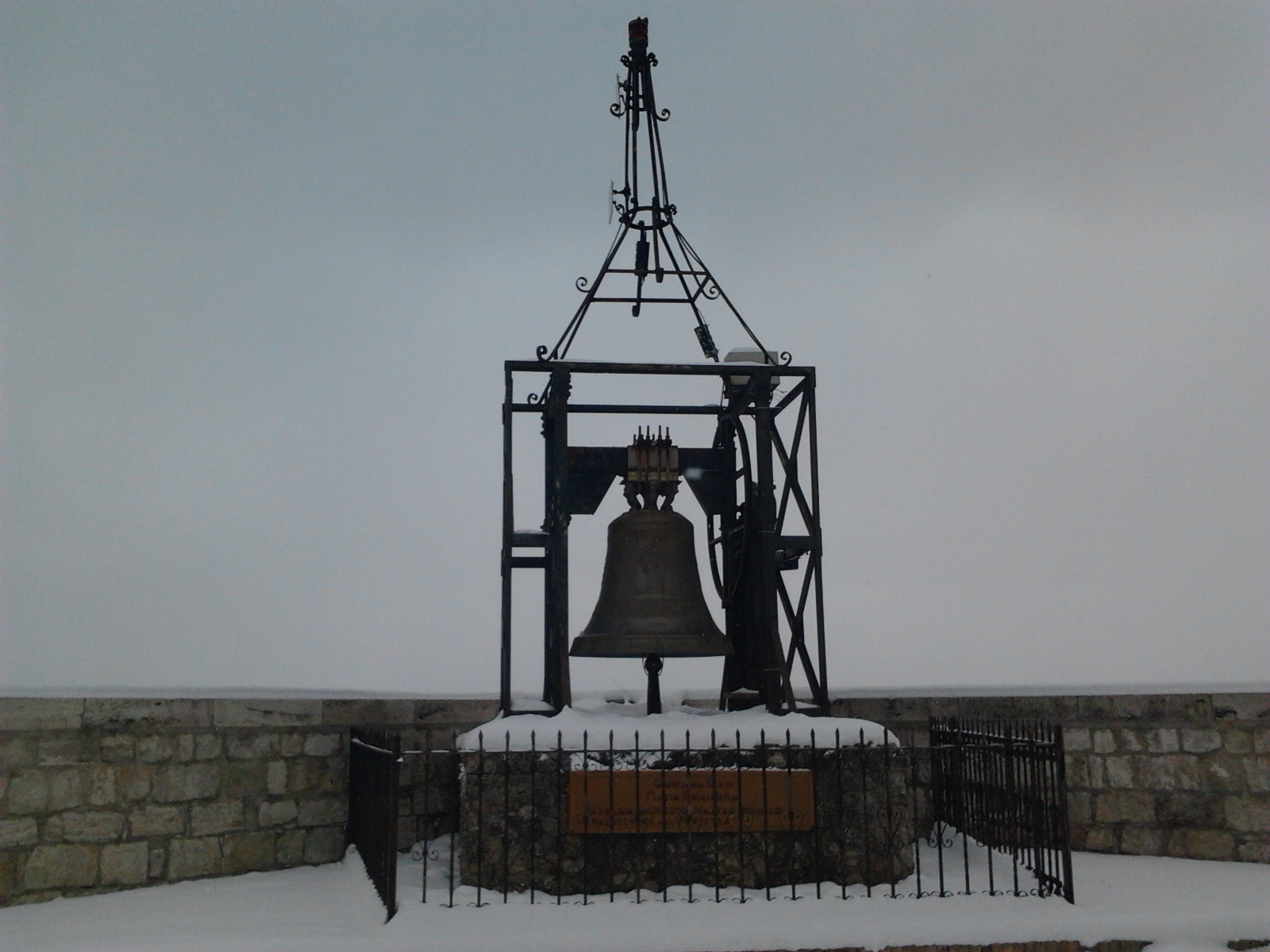
Bell dedicated to the Fallen of all wars.

=== La Grande Piazza ===
Following the walkway leads to the octagonal San Giacomo bastion in the third and last parade ground, known as the "Gran Piazza" (Grand Square), located at the highest point of the fortress.
It is the largest square in the fortification, housing the citadel where the two most important buildings within the defensive structure were erected: the Governor's Palace and the Church of San Giacomo.

=== Palazzo del Governatore ===
The building represented the symbol of political power and housed the fortress command. Inaugurated in 1574, it stood two stories tall and accommodated the governor and his family. Inside, it included storage for provisions, a cistern, and an oven. Between 1841 and 1843, it housed Carlo Pisacane.

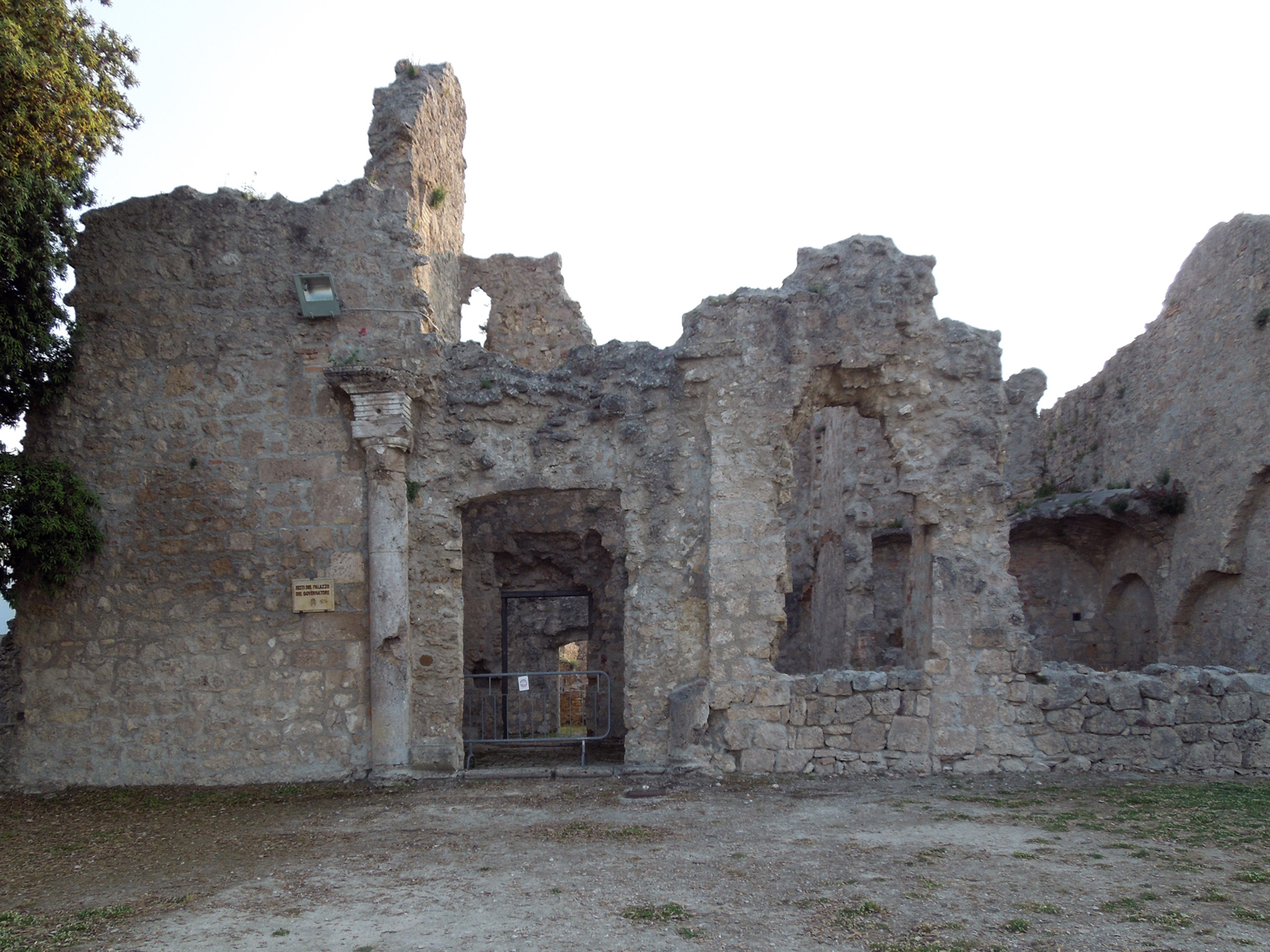
Remains of the facade of Palazzo del Governatore.

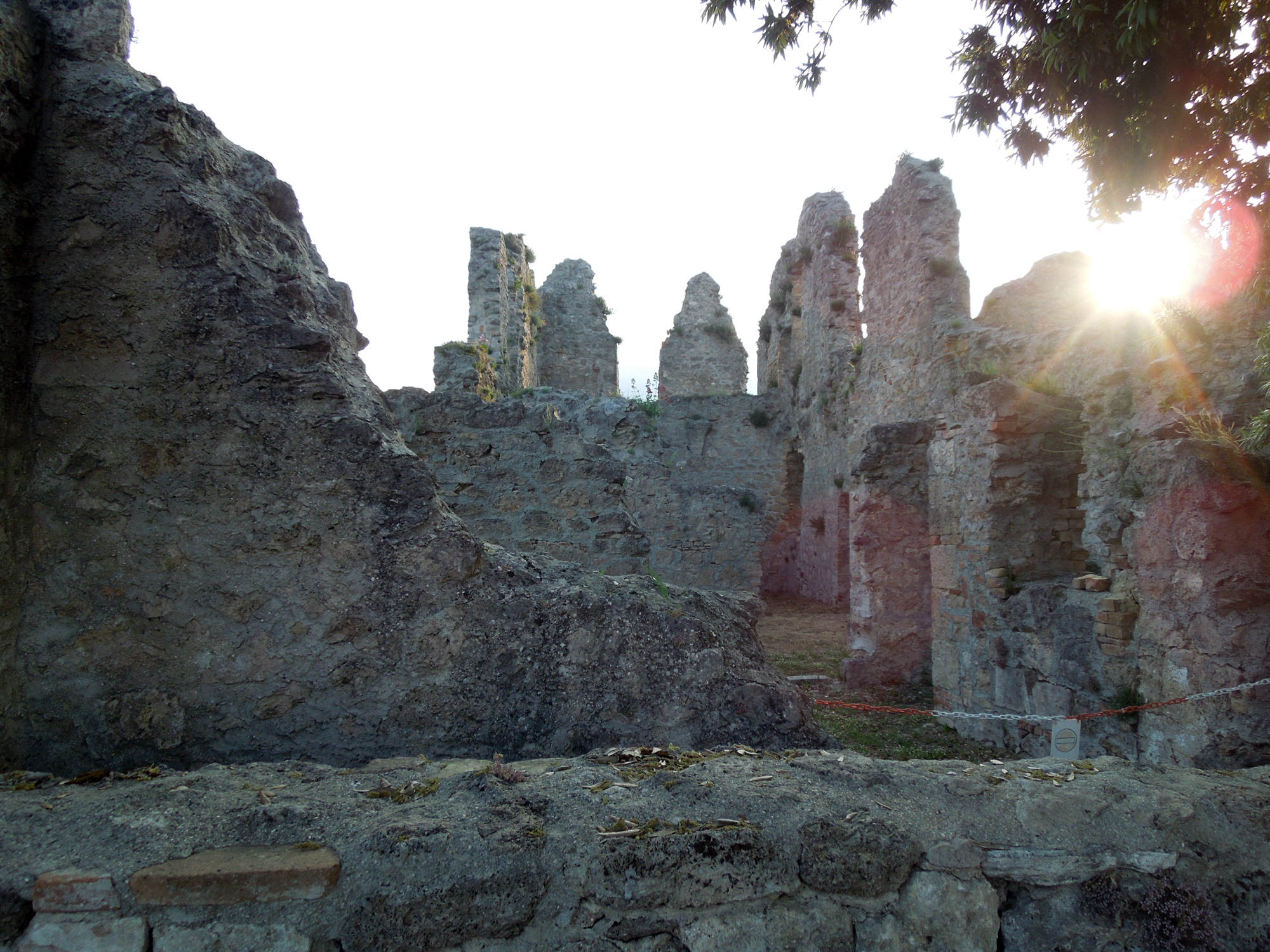
Ruins of the interior of the palace.

=== Chiesa di San Giacomo ===
Dedicated to Saint James of the Marches, the church symbolized religious power. Built alongside the Palazzo del Governatore in 1585 and consecrated in 1604, its current layout has altered the outlines and partially the characteristics of the original structure. Its liturgical hall has been shortened in length, and the plaster that once covered the vault is no longer present. Inside, it housed a main altar and three minor altars dedicated respectively to the Rosary, Saint Joseph, and Saint Barbara, and was also the burial place of the castle lords. Below the structure are rock-hewn passages of probable medieval origin.

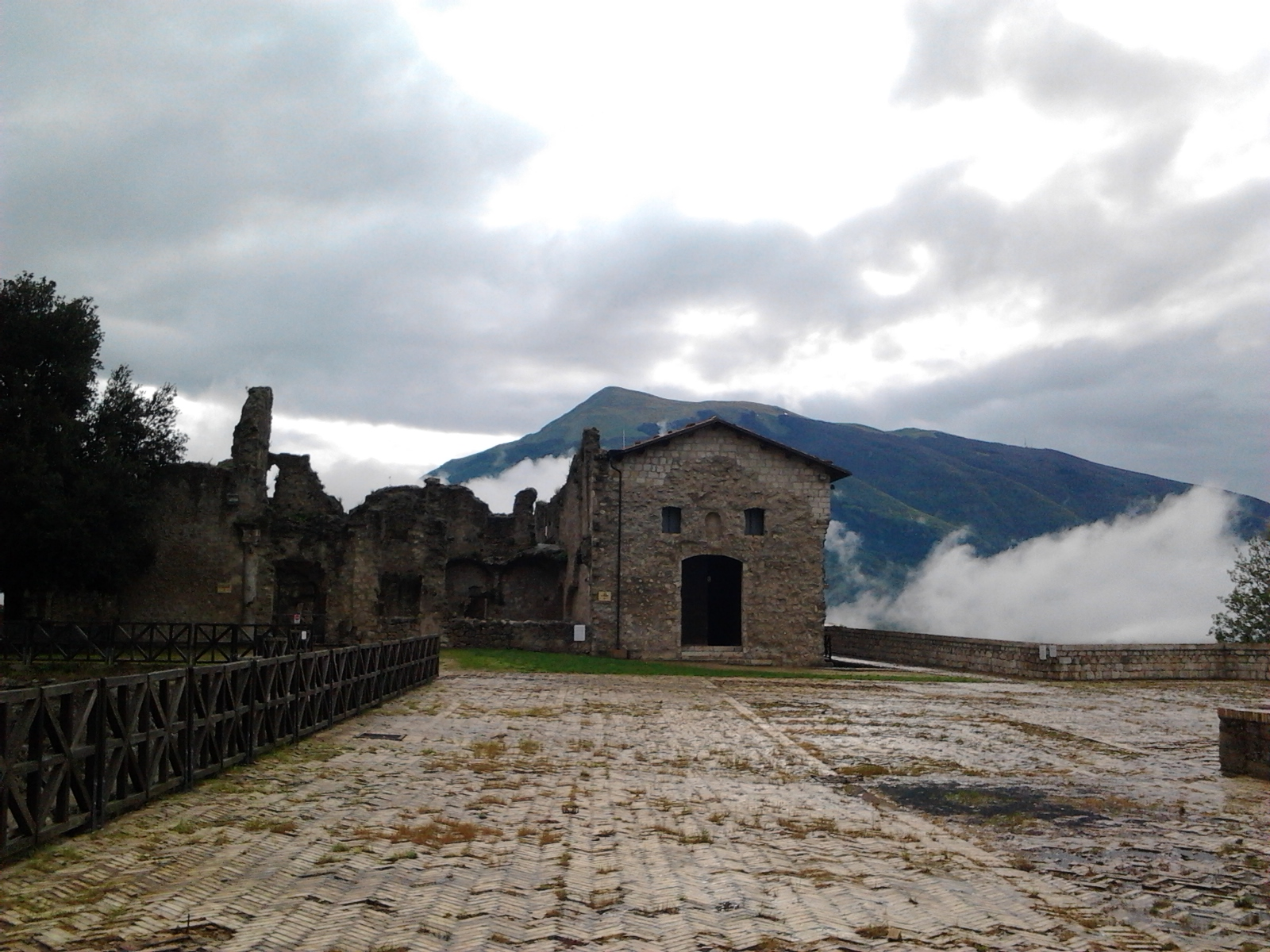
Facade of the Church of San Giacomo.

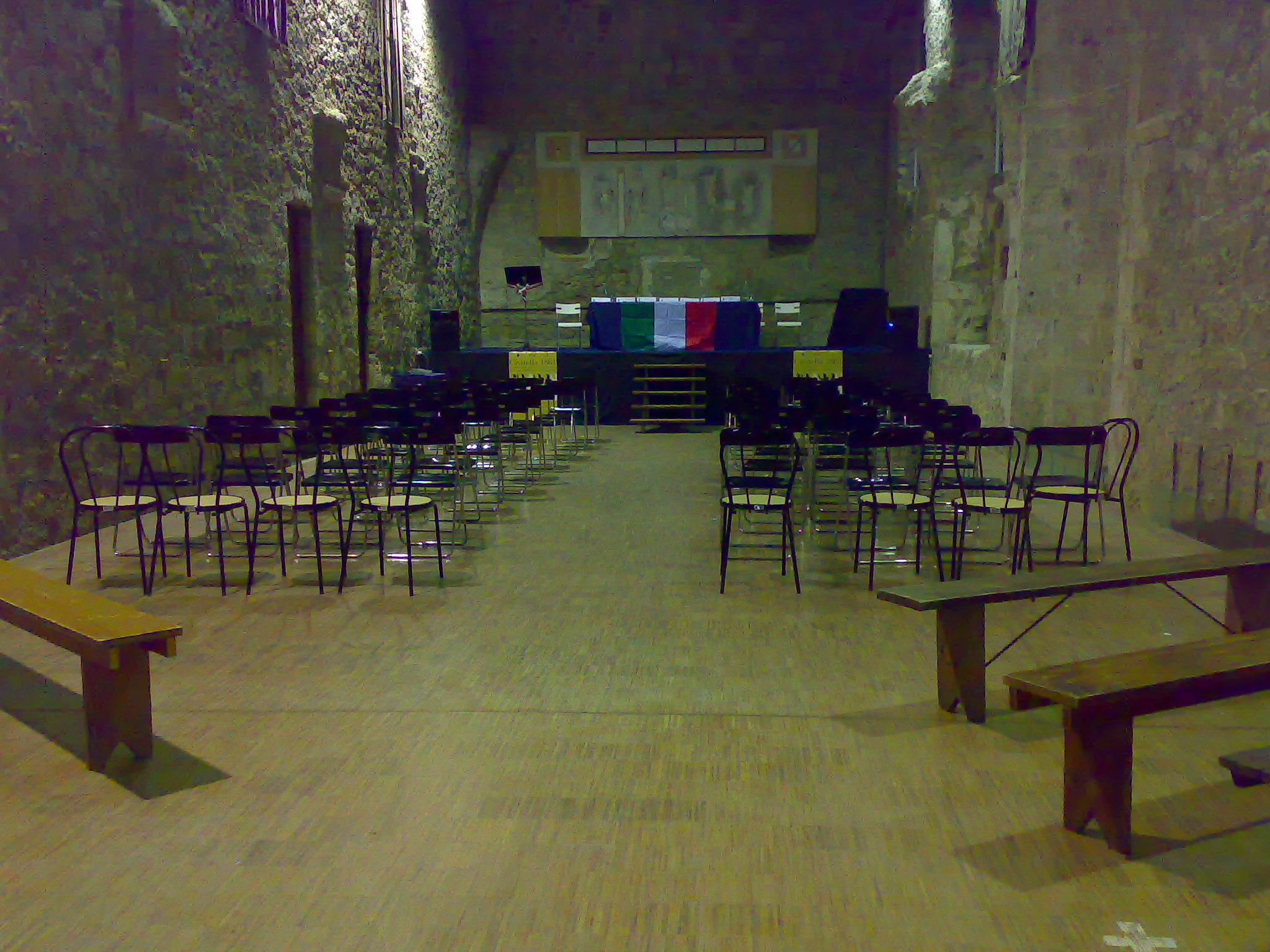
Interior hall of the church.

== Museum of Arms and Ancient Maps ==
Within the constructions of the Civitella fortress, originally designated for kitchens and mess halls, the Museum of Arms and Ancient Maps was inaugurated in 1988. Its premises consist of four exhibition halls showcasing maps, weapons, and other objects related to the history and various fortunes of the fortress.

In the hall dedicated to Giorgio Cucentrentoli di Monteloro, the museum houses more modern artifacts, including a papal helmet from 1848 belonging to the troops of Pius IX, a pontifical diplomatic uniform, documents, and weapons associated with the Garibaldian and House of Savoy eras.

The Risorgimento Hall displays weapons that belonged to the Bourbon and Savoy armies. Of particular interest is a representation of Civitella from 1557.

The third hall features a central boundary marker column. This column marked the demarcation line between the Papal State and the Kingdom of the Two Sicilies. Engraved on the upper part of the shaft are the keys of St. Peter with the date 1847, the Bourbon lily, and the progressive number 609.

The Renaissance Hall houses the oldest weapons in the exhibition, including matchlock muskets from the 15th century, flintlock pistols from the 18th century, and depictions of the fortress from the 18th century and 19th century.

On August 28, 2015, the museum was dedicated to Major Raffaele Tiscar in a dedication ceremony attended by the authorities of Civitella and the great-grandson of Major Piergiorgio Tiscar. The plaque affixed at the museum entrance reads: "The municipality of Civitella del Tronto, in memory of the last siege of this fortress, a proud bastion through the centuries, dedicates the Museum of Arms and the Fortress to Major RAFFAELE TISCAR, a Bourbon officer who, faithful to his oath, stood alongside Commander La Piazza until, as dictated by King Francesco II, he was given the ungrateful task of signing the surrender of the fortress to the besieging Piedmontese Command. It was March 20, 1861."

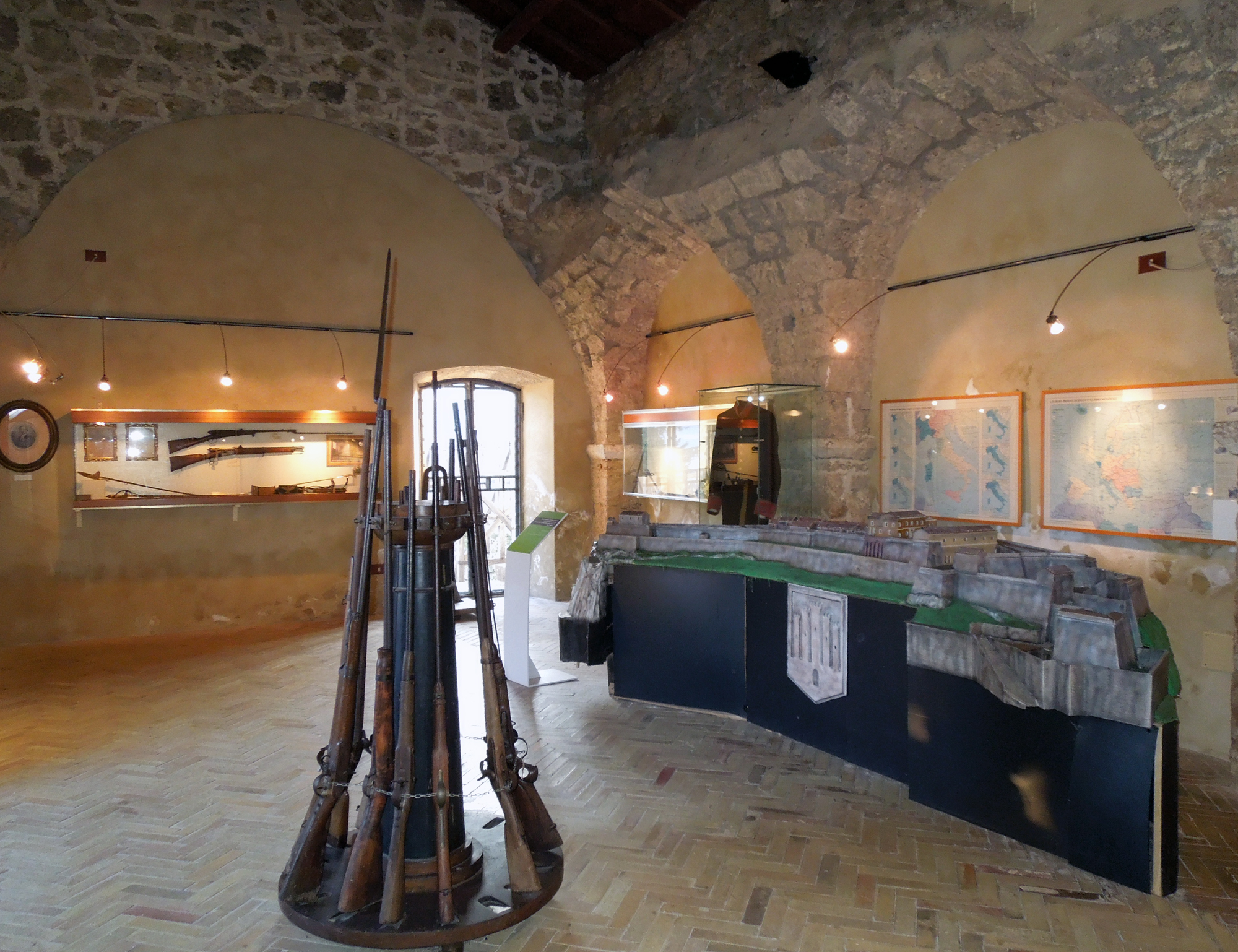
Exhibition hall.

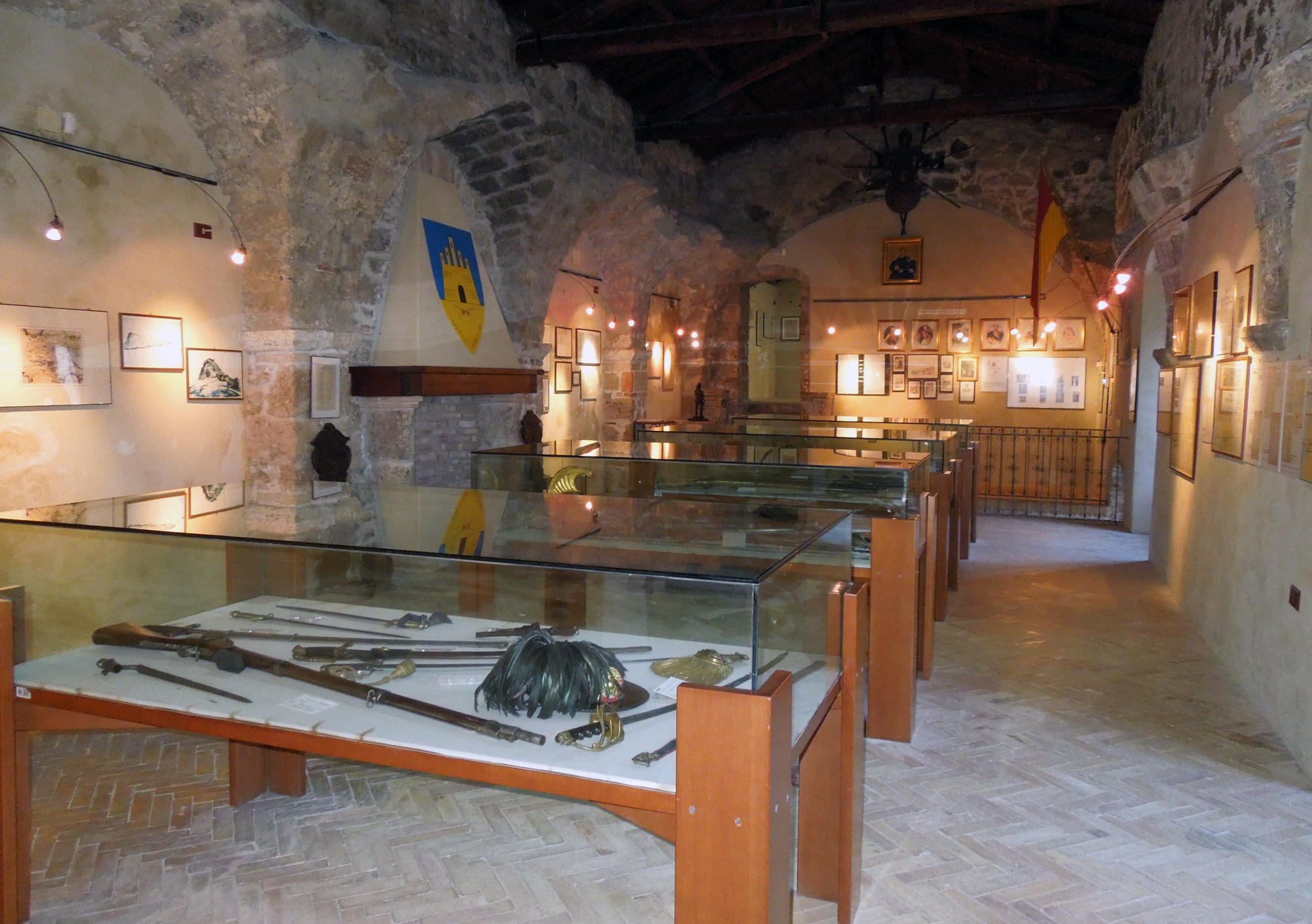
Exhibition hall.

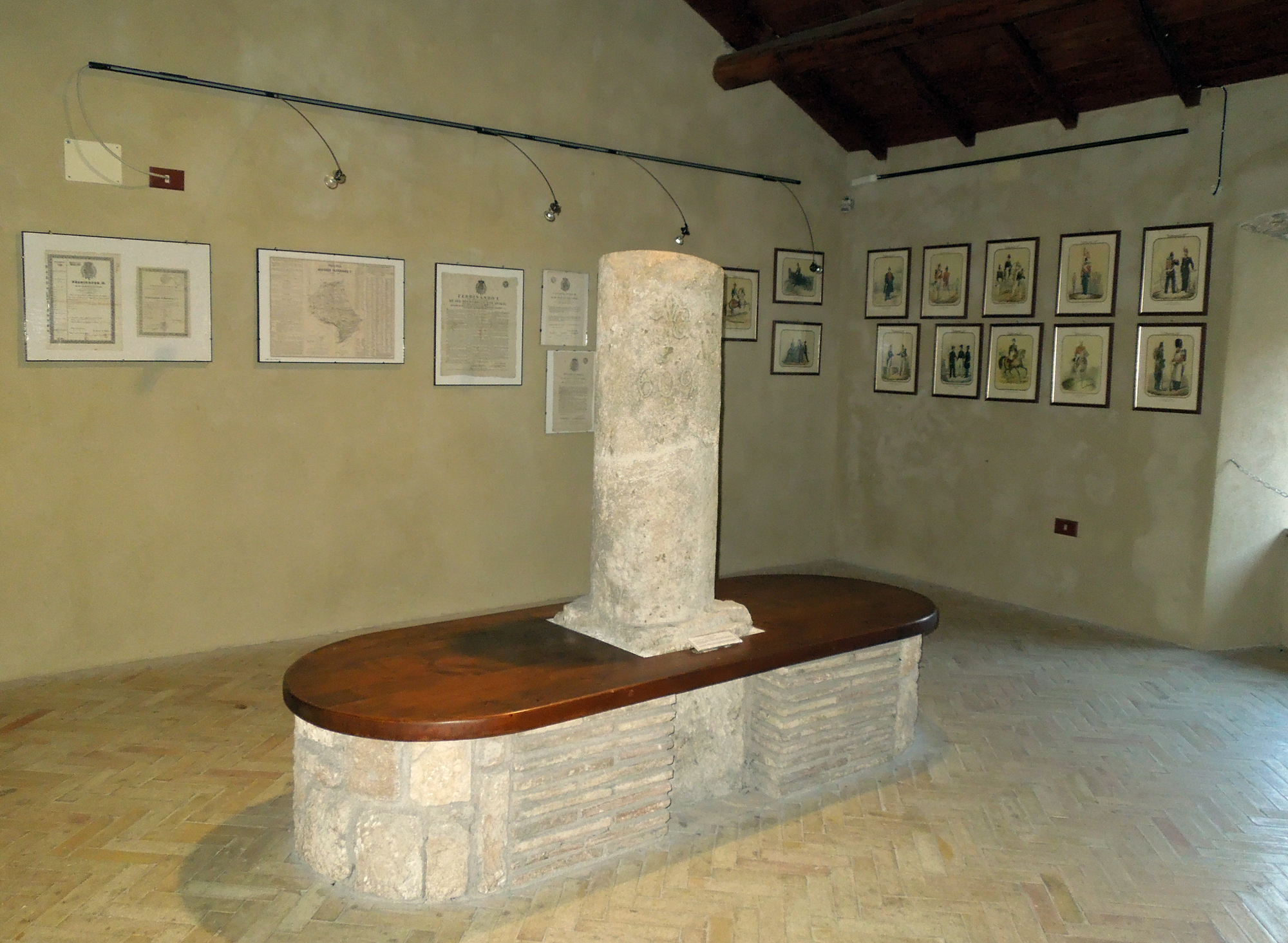
Exhibition hall.
