= Matteo Wade =

Irish soldier and commander

- Burial place: Civitella del Tronto
- Military career
- Conflicts: Napoleonic Wars

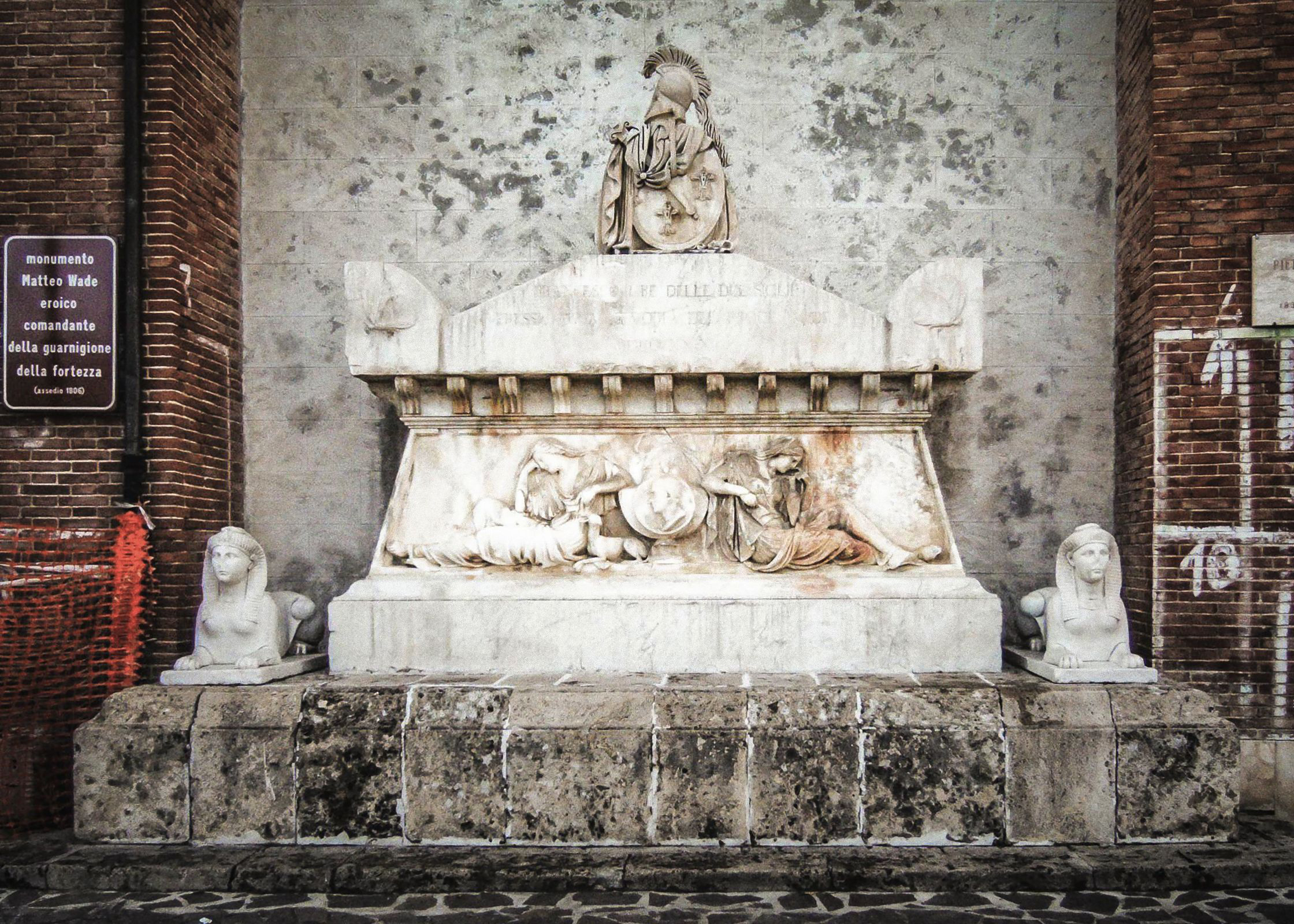
Monument to Matteo Wade in Civitella del Tronto

Matthew Wade was an Irish soldier and commander. In 1806 he was in charge of fortress "Civitella" in Abruzzo, against Joachim Murat's French siege. Despite being just 300 defenders, the French were held off from 27 March to 21 May, when they were forced to surrender and taken prisoner.

Matthew Wade is commemorated with a monumental tomb in Civitella, erected in 1829.

== See also ==
- Napoleonic Wars
