= Castel Manfrino =

Middle Ages castle in Abruzzo, Italy

Coordinates: 42.7476°N 13.5896°E

Manfrino Castle
- Castel Manfrino
- Valle Castellana
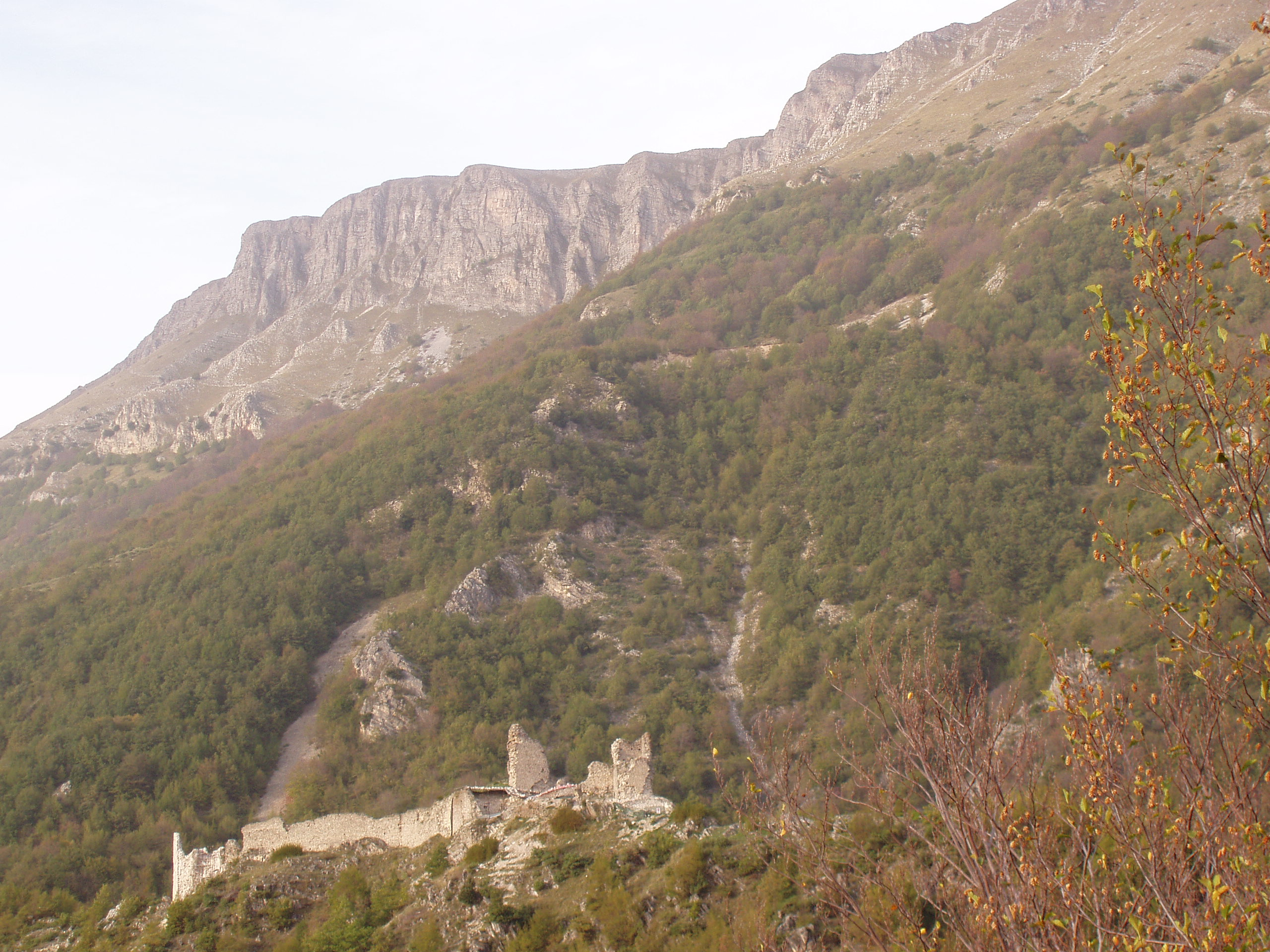
- View of the castle

Site information
- Type: Castle

Location

Site history
- Built: 12th century

Castel Manfrino (Italian for Manfrino Castle) is a ruined Middle Ages castle located in Sella di Castel Manfrino, near the hamlet of Macchia da Sole, within the municipality of Valle Castellana in the province of Teramo, inside the Gran Sasso e Monti della Laga National Park.

== History ==
The castle was built on the remains of an ancient Roman fortress, constructed to defend the road that branched off from the Via Salaria near Amatrice and, through the so-called Pass of Hannibal, reached the plain of Campovalano. Built in the late Middle Ages between the 12th and 13th centuries, it owes its name to Manfred of Swabia, son of Frederick II. The historian from Ascoli, Secondo Balena, also cites the names "Castello di re Manfredi" and "Castel Manfredino," which over time became Castel Manfrino. In documents, it is also mentioned as Castrum Maccle, the castle of Macchia. In the Catalogus Baronum, it is indicated as the fief of Macclam in Asculo.

The fort served as a lookout and observation point to control the route that climbed up the southern slope of Montagna dei Fiori and, from the locality of Civitella del Tronto, reached the mountain from which it was possible to observe the northern slope where the city of Ascoli Piceno is located.

The castle was erected at the behest of Manfred of Sicily on earlier fortified constructions to control, along with the fortress of Civitella del Tronto, the only roads crossing the mountains that connected Ascoli Piceno to Teramo, better known as the "routes of Abruzzo Ascolano."

During the 13th century, after the disappearance of Manfred, the fort passed to Armellino di Macchia di Giacomo, who was later expelled and considered a rebel. He was succeeded by Pietro d'Isola, an Angevin, who was killed during the attack launched against him by the Ascoli inhabitants, commanded by his predecessor Armellino. The Ascoli inhabitants launched the attack following numerous conflicts generated with Charles of Anjou, and the castle was the subject of bitter disputes for long periods to assert "ancient rights". In 1273, it was granted as a fief to Riccardo di Agello.

In 1280 – 1281, Charles I commissioned the Master Pierre d'Angicourt, the same architect who designed the castle of Barletta, then active in Abruzzo, to design a defensive tower to be built within the Castro di Macchia and to study appropriate restoration works. The tower was to serve as a guard tower and be located near the entrance to the enclosure. Inside, it was to feature a cistern for collecting rainwater on the ground floor, an air chamber on the upper floor, and the last two floors above for residential use. The entrance door to the Angevin tower was to be on the south side, at a safe height above the ground level.

From 1361, after the defeat of Manfred and Conradin of Swabia and the betrayal and disappearance of the Ghibelline lord Cola di Macchia, Castel Manfrino no longer belonged to Ascoli subjugation and came under the jurisdiction of the ruling house of Naples of the Angevin dynasty.

== Architecture ==
The ruins are located at an altitude of 963 meters, on a rocky spur overlooking the top of the cliff that dominates the course of the Salinello river, on the border between the province of Ascoli Piceno and the province of Teramo.

The height rises between the Monti Gemelli, that is, between the Montagna dei Fiori and the "Montagna di Campli". The strategic and panoramic location offers a wide view of the underlying valleys, suitable for controlling and spotting the routes that wind through the territory between the Salinello valley and the Rivolta gorge. The site is accessible via the "Strada statale 81 Piceno Aprutina" which connects the cities of Ascoli Piceno and Teramo. Then proceed along the provincial road 52 and follow the signs for the hamlet of Macchia da Sole. From this village, a dirt path climbs along the side of the mountain and, after about 20 minutes on foot, leads to the remains of the castle.

The layout of the castle develops with a longitudinal orientation from north to south. The outer walls of the fortification were built using the natural defensibility of the site, following the profile of the rocky spur that hosts them. They have no other openings besides the single entrance to the enclosure.

Made of river stones cemented and smoothed only on the outer side, they extend for about 120 meters, and the width of the enclosed area varies from 8 to 20 meters. The thickness of the walls ranges from 50 cm to one meter. The structure does not have bastions, perhaps originally present only near the north-facing entrance.

Diametrically opposite the entrance, still partially preserved and visible, is the tower, which had no access openings at the base. It was divided into several floors with wooden balconies and used both as the residence of the castellan and as a place of defense in case of need. Of this tower, with a quadrangular base measuring about 10 meters per side, only the first floor and the cistern remain, while the upper part consists of a few wall stumps on the east and west sides and an exposed west wall. Beyond its base, there are also the outlines of other rooms reaching the base of a second tower, the central one, about ten meters high. The exterior of this tower shows a sooty cap, indicating it was the place where oil was boiled to pour on enemies. To support this hypothesis, two cauldrons were found in the underlying Rivolta stream.

Inside the enclosure walls are the remains of a probable small chapel with a quadrangular plan, near the south tower. A document from 1277 reports the stable presence of a chaplain in the castle, supporting the hypothesis of a place of worship. At the base of the wall, faint traces of frescoes are visible.

The construction of Castel Manfrino is very similar to that of other fortified works in the province of L'Aquila such as San Pio delle Camere.

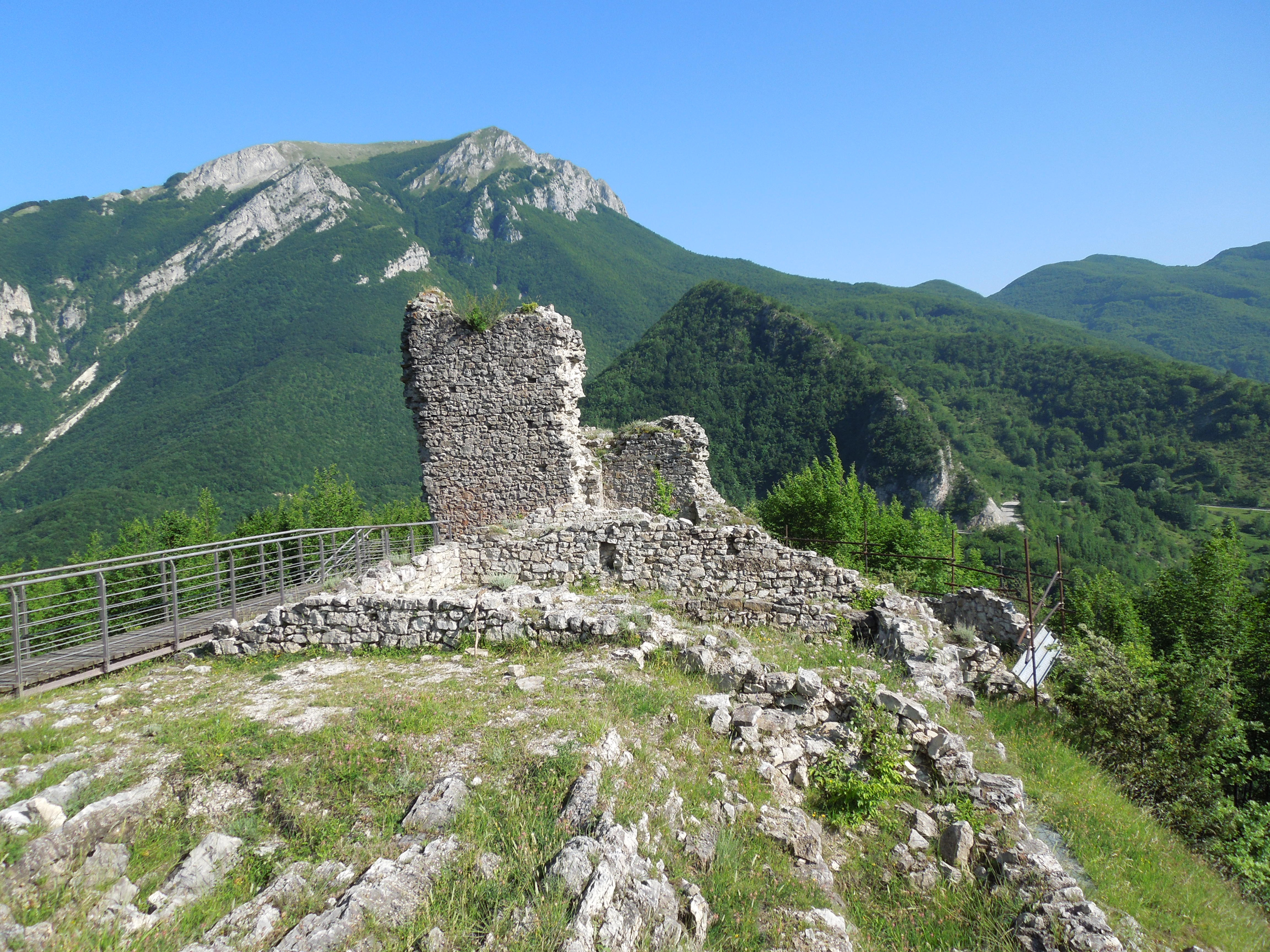
Remains of the south-facing tower and partial interior of the enclosure.

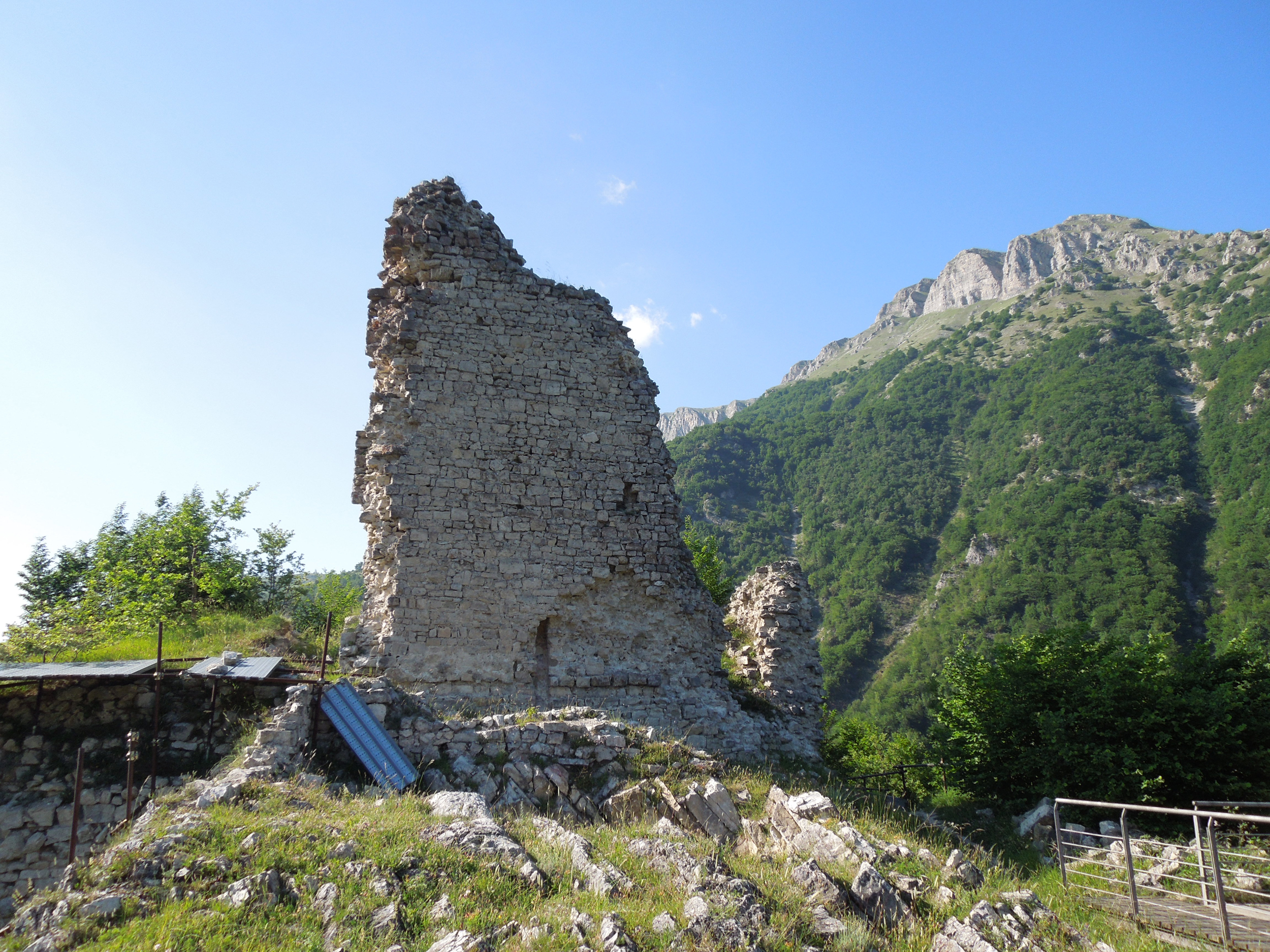
Ruins of the tower, also known as the keep, in the center of the enclosure.

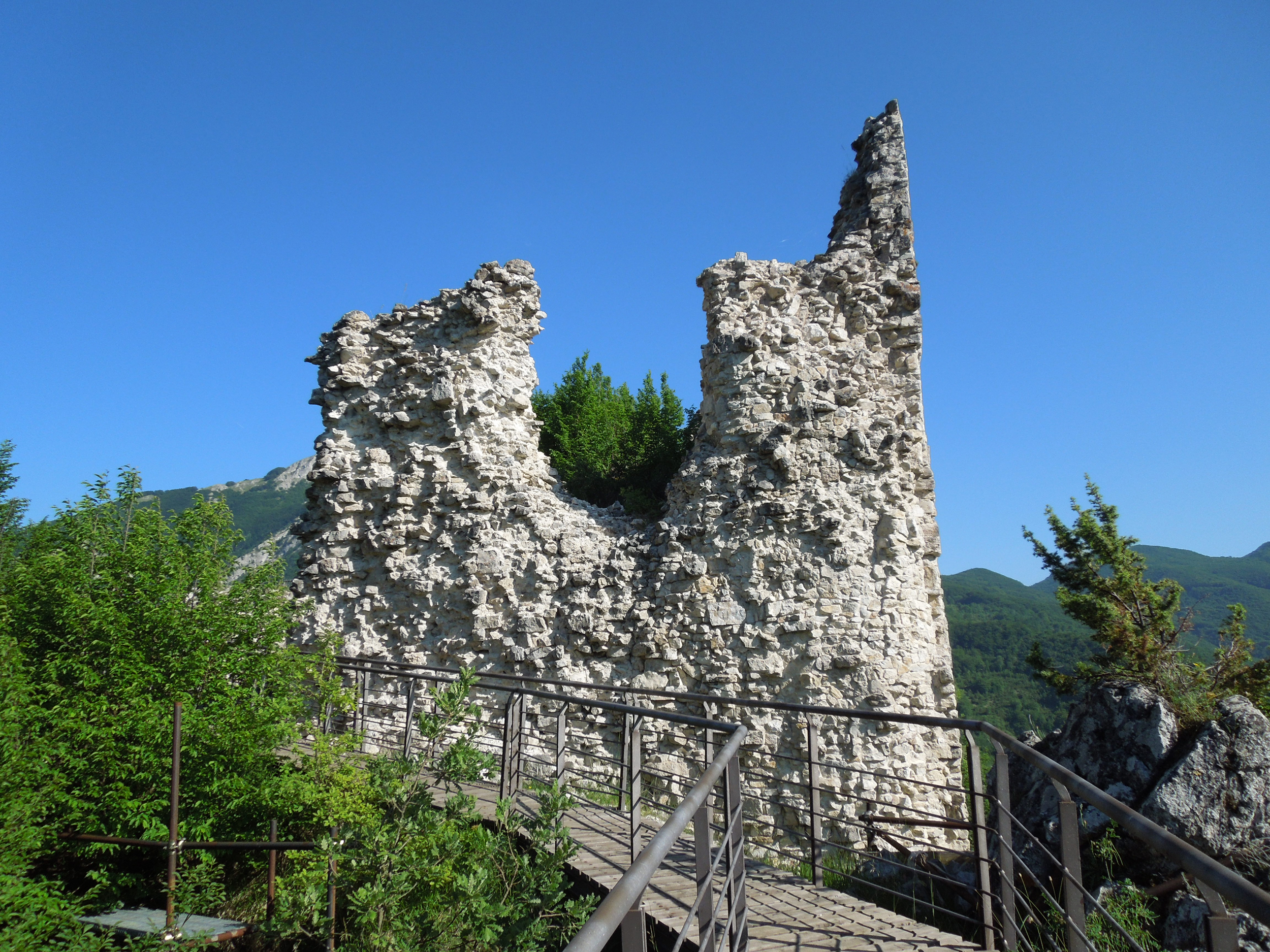
Ruins of the north-facing tower.

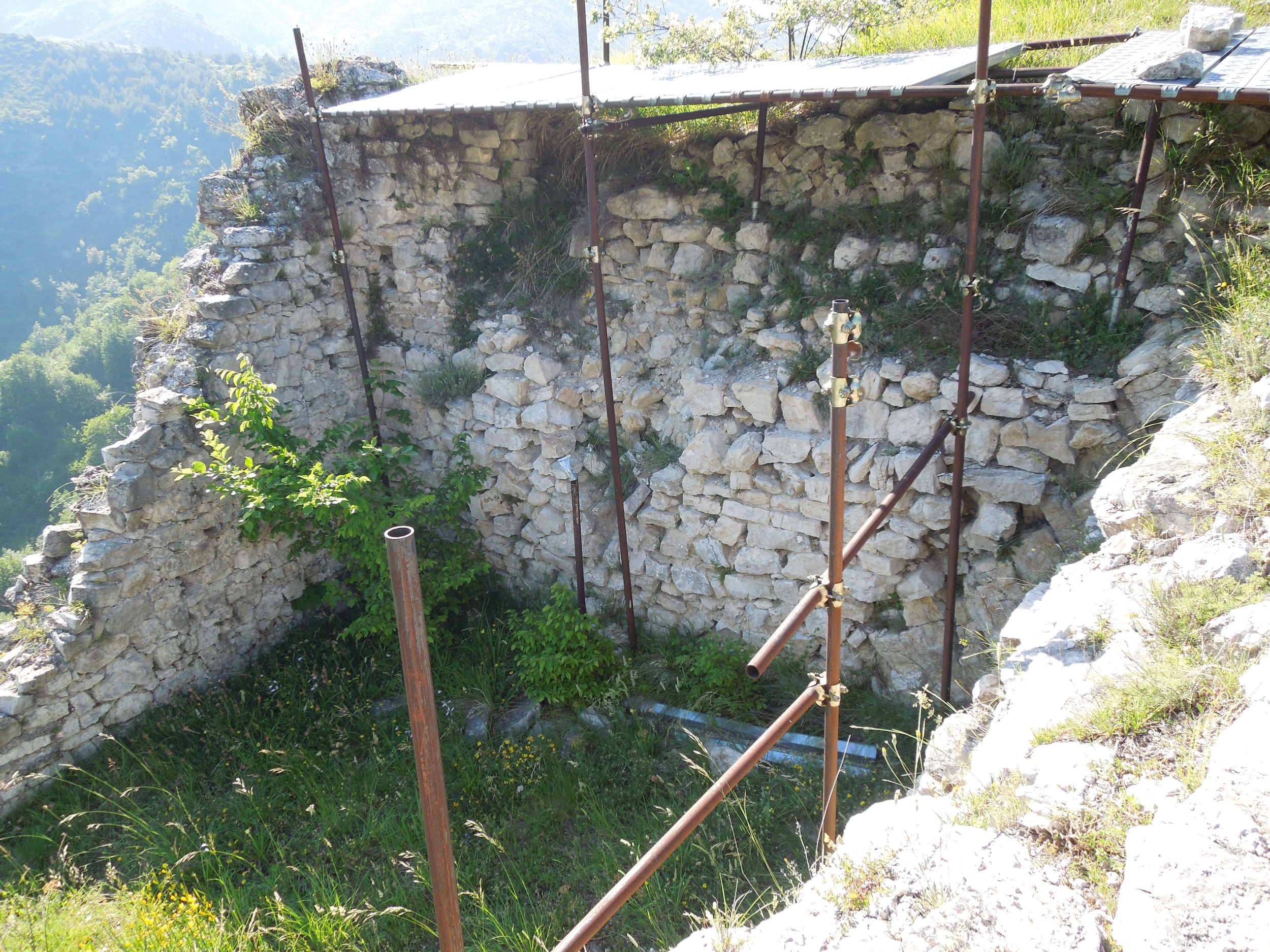
Wall near the Swabian keep.

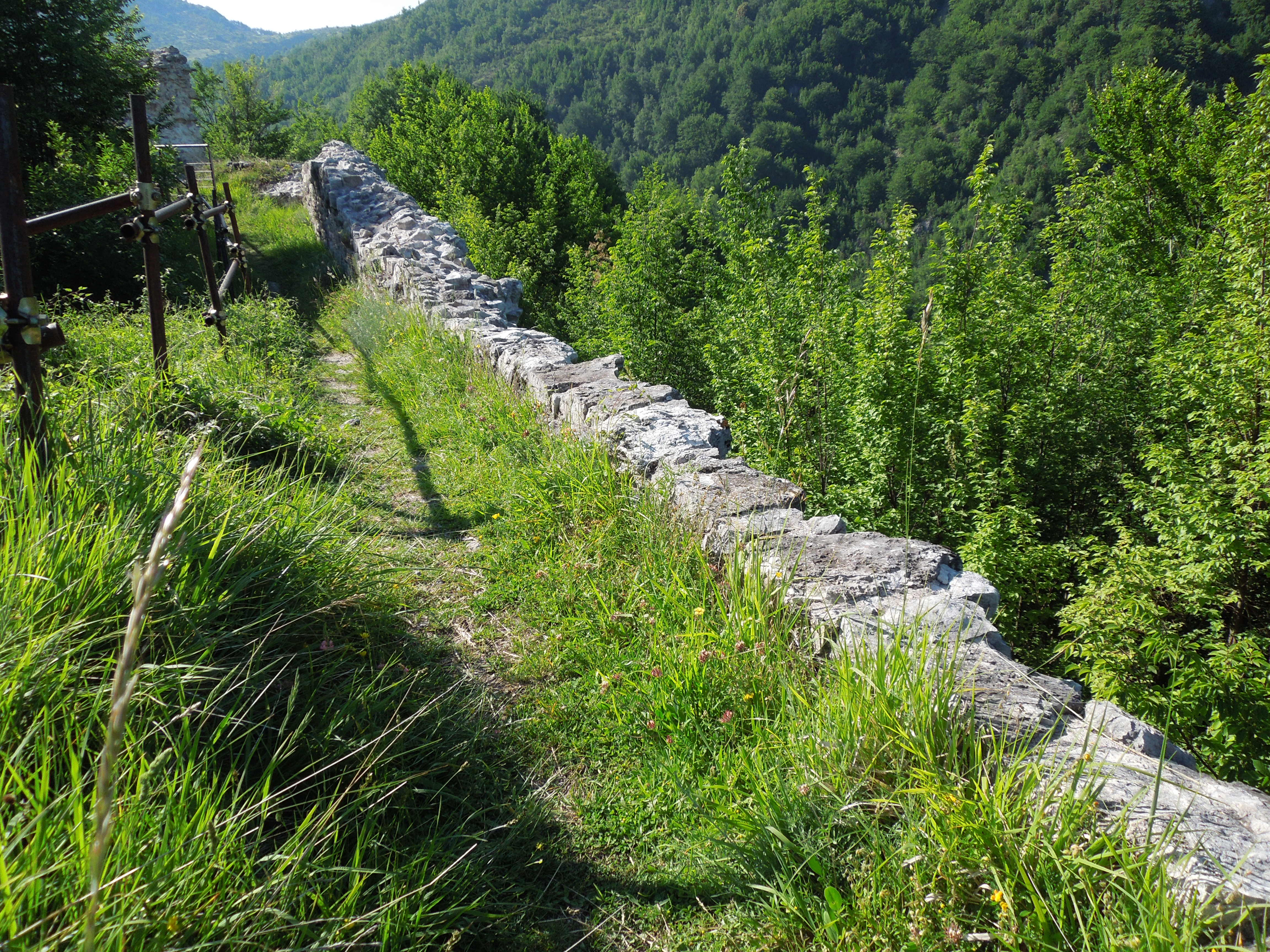
Remains of the enclosure wall.

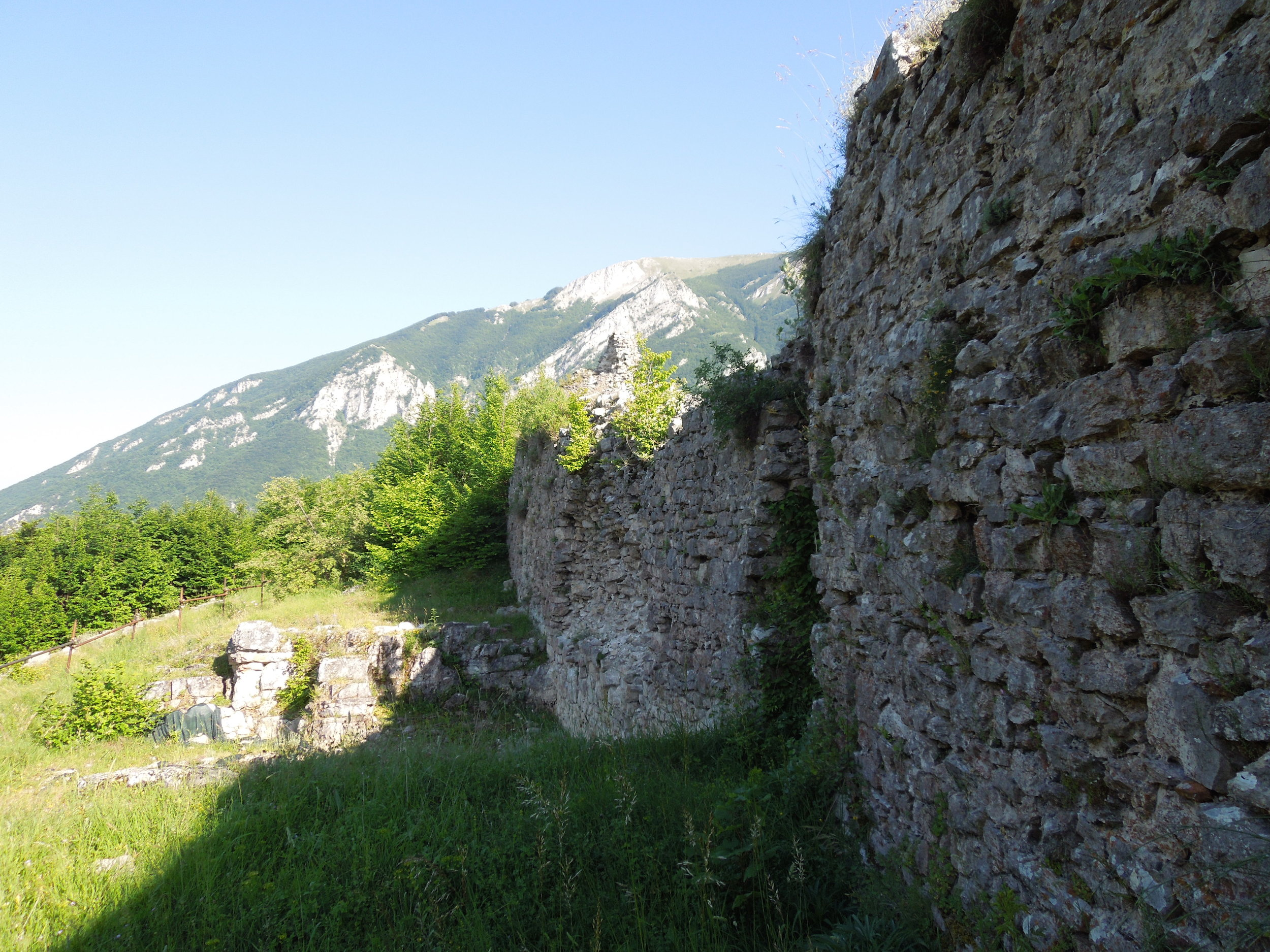
Wall enclosing part of the internal area of the enclosure.

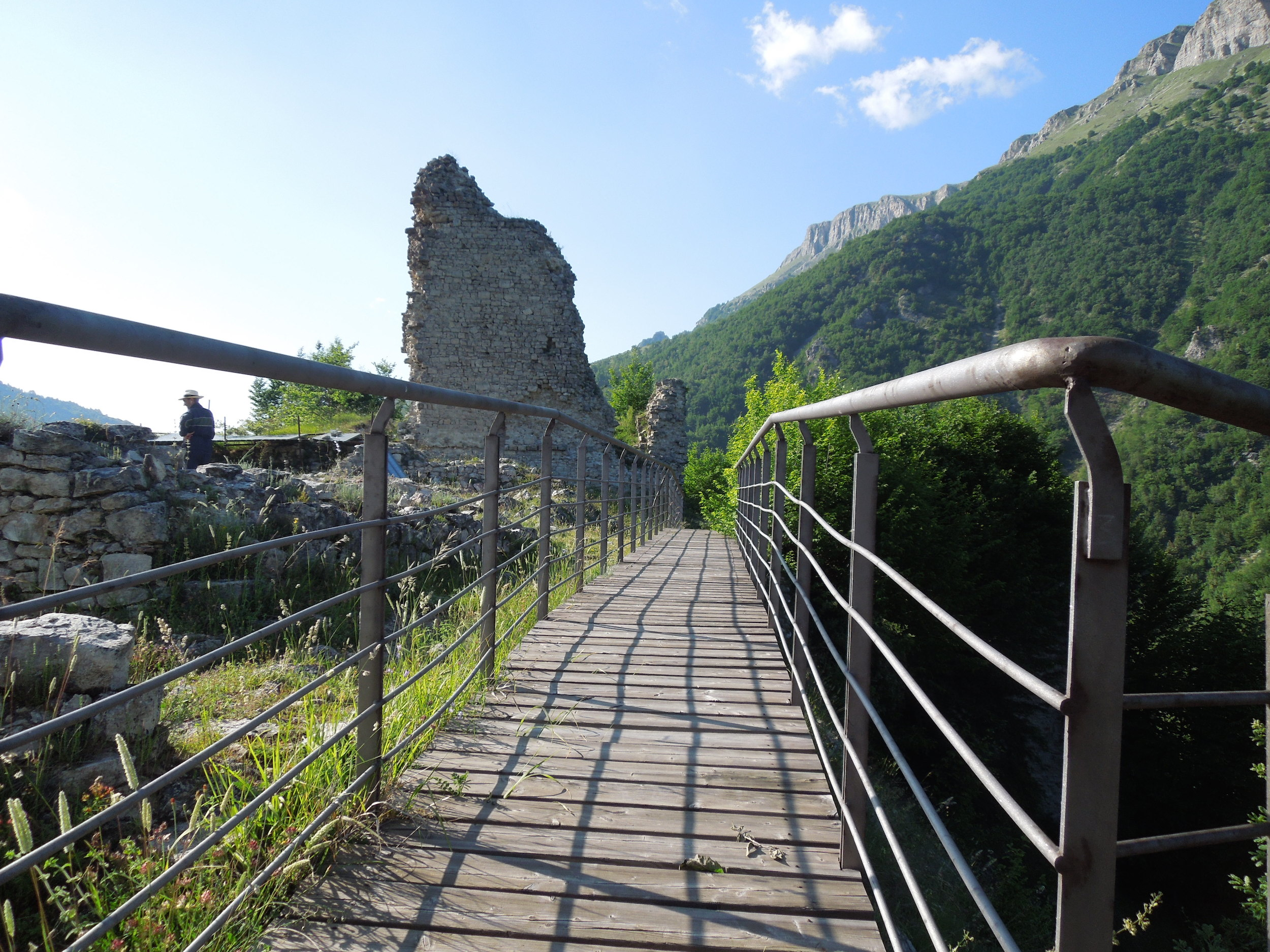
Wooden walkway tracing part of the path.

== Discoveries ==
From excavations conducted at different times, the technical report of the studies carried out by the Consorzio Aprutino Patrimonio Storico e Artistico of Teramo lists the following findings:

- Various arrowheads classified as square-headed;
- Fragments of ceramics dating from the 16th to the 17th century;
- Several layers of flooring below the current walking surface;
- Some coins;
- Traces of a fresco, revealed by the clearing of the tower.
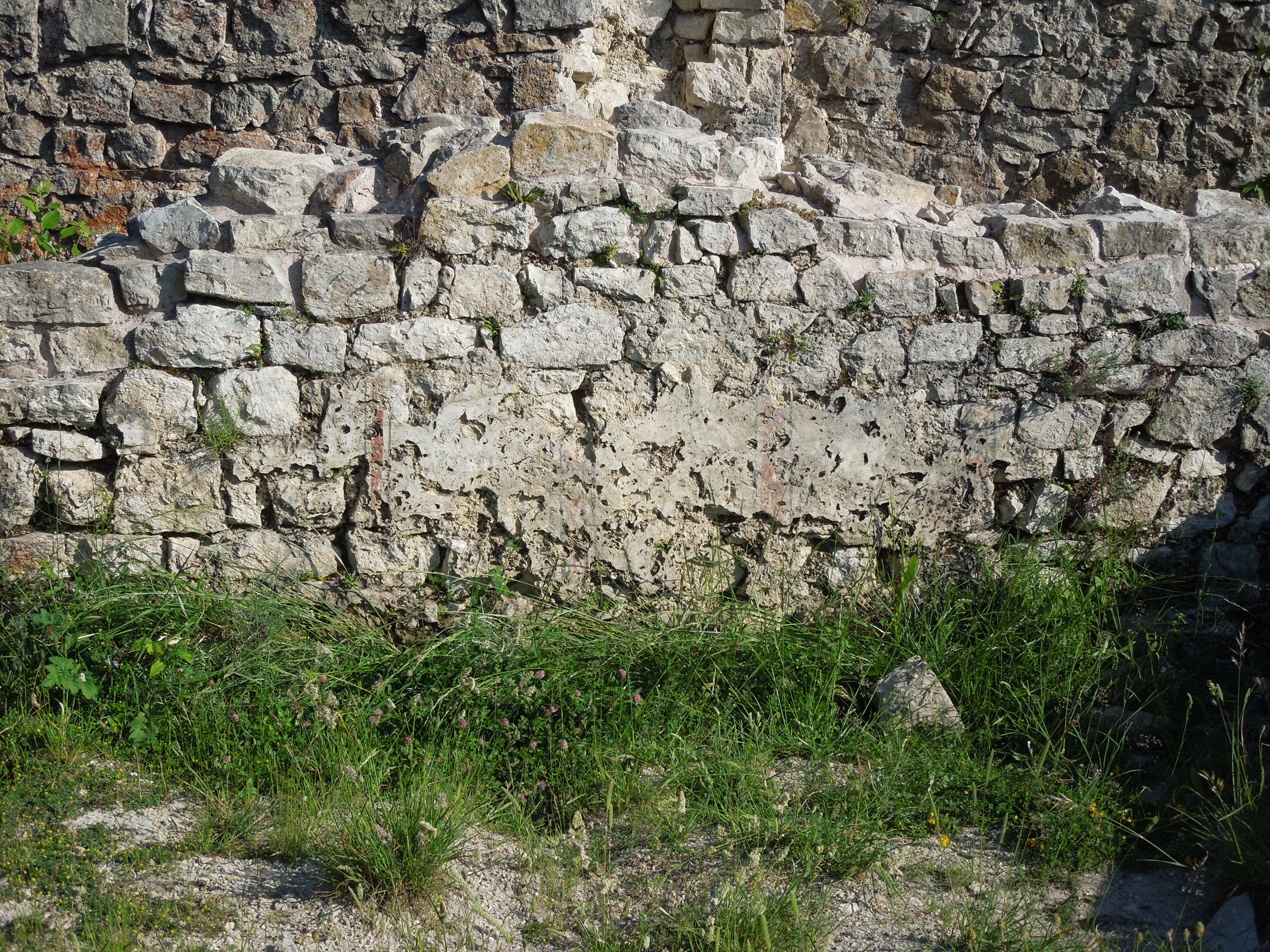
Wall with traces of fresco inside the enclosure.

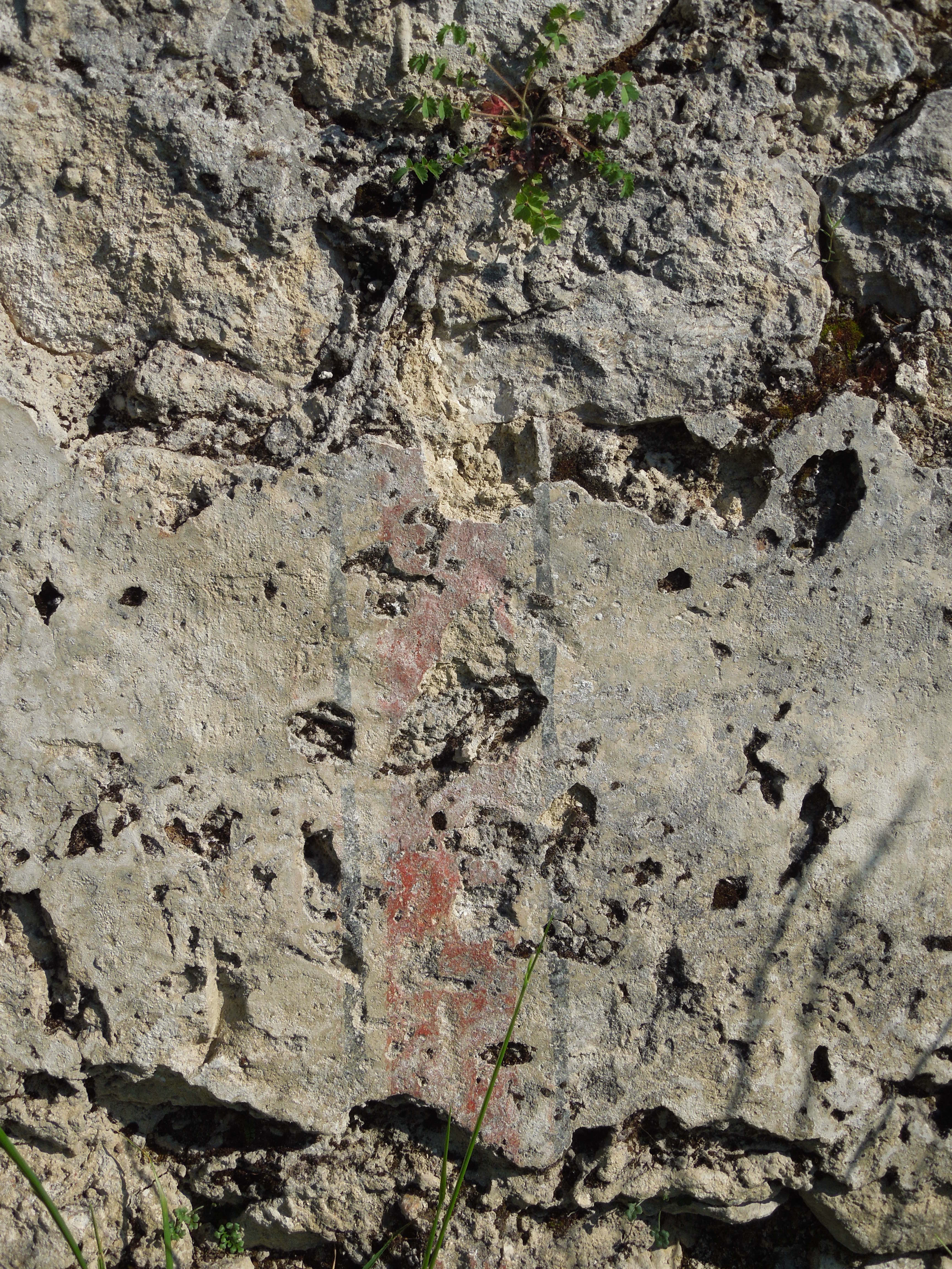
Detail of one of the fresco traces.

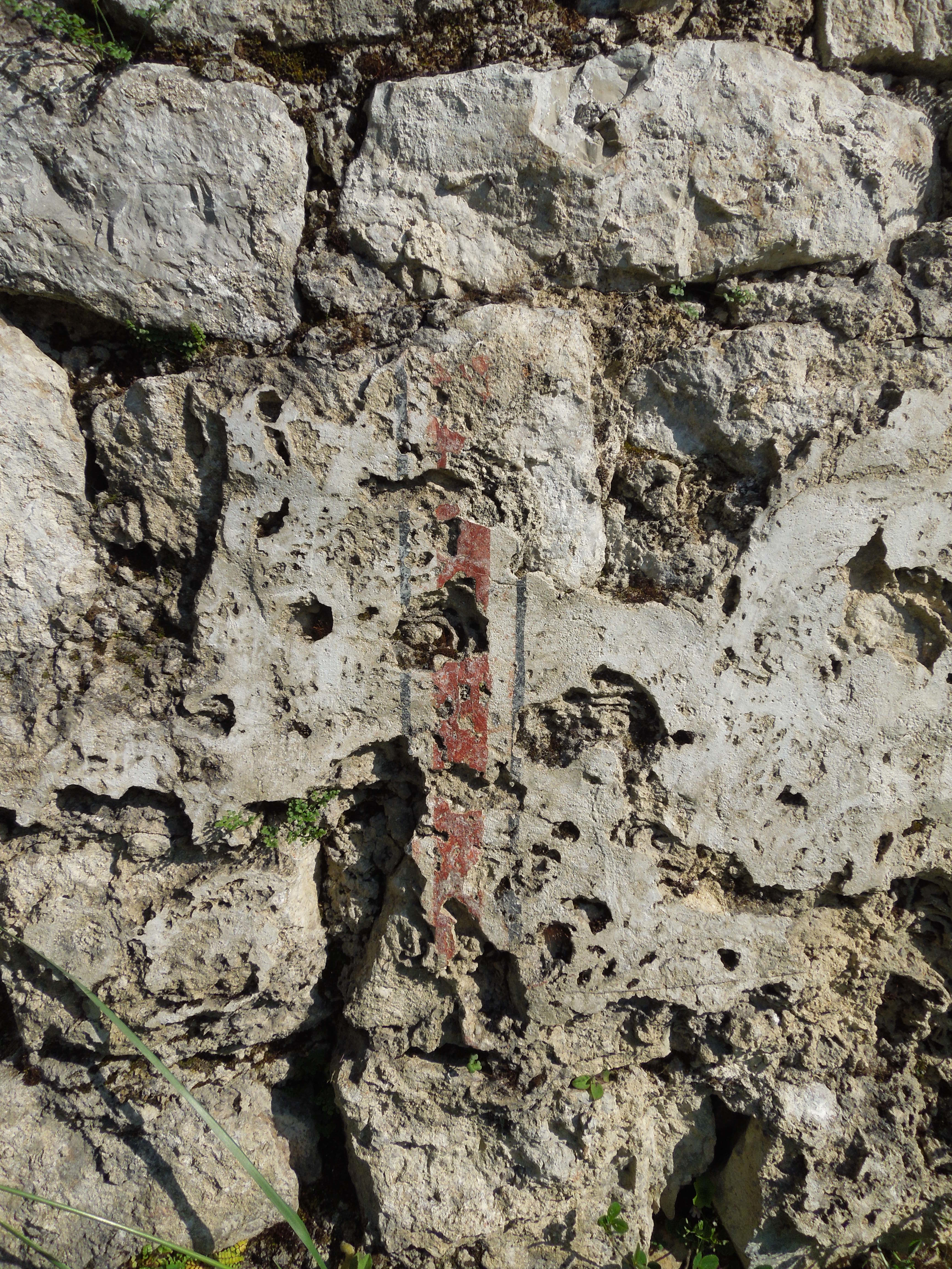
Detail of one of the fresco traces.

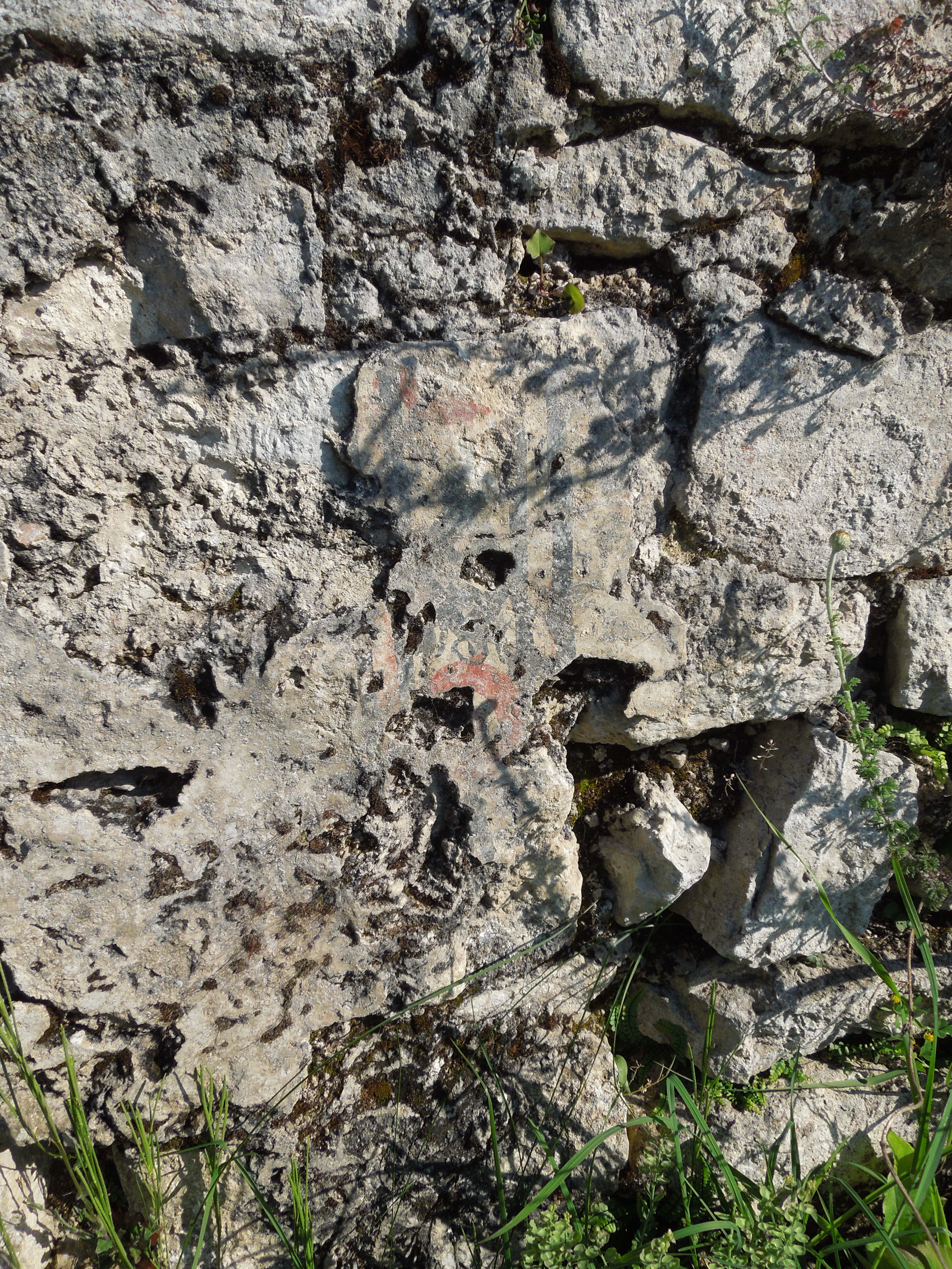
Detail of one of the fresco traces.

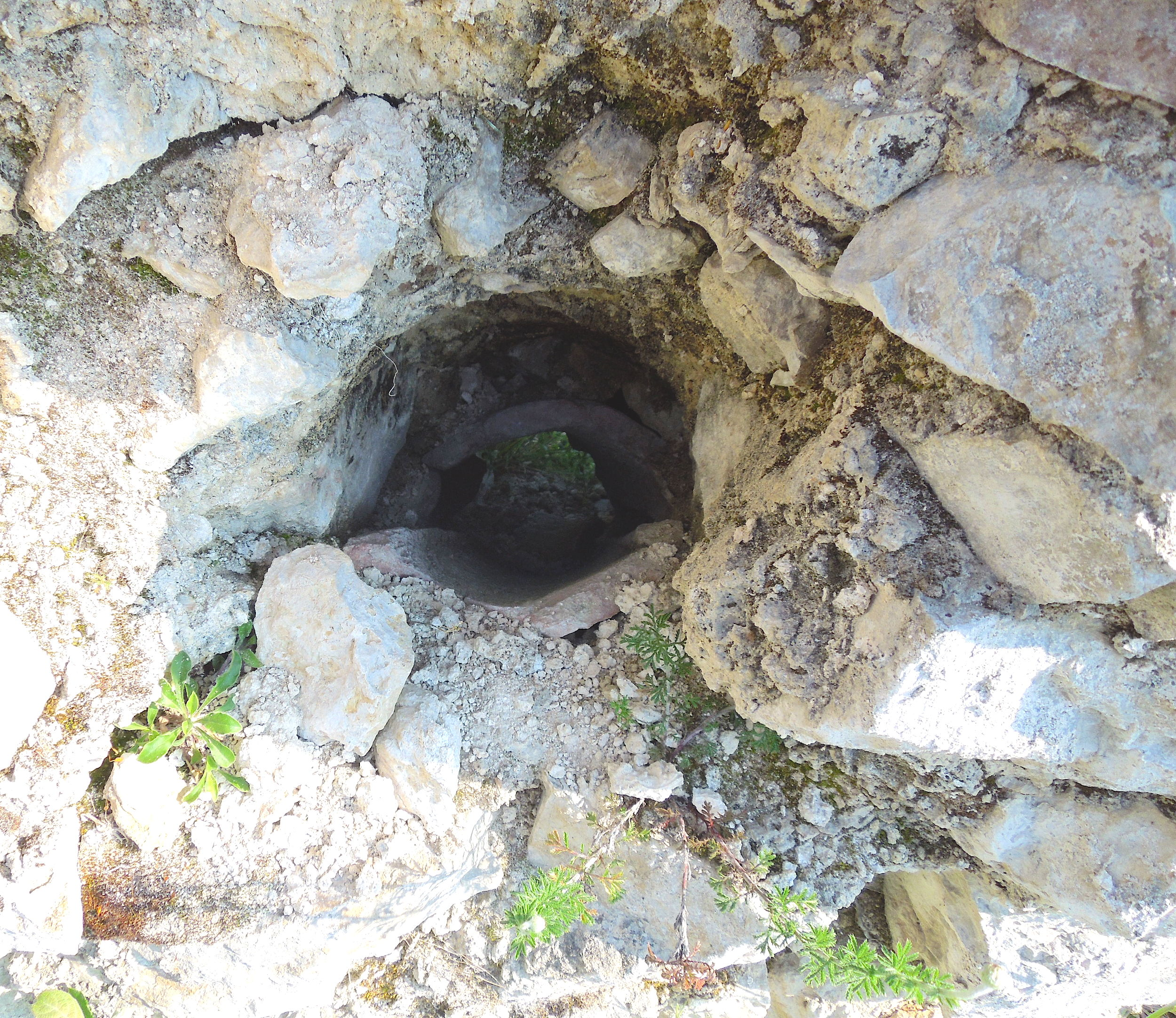
Detail of the hole in a small wall inside the enclosure.

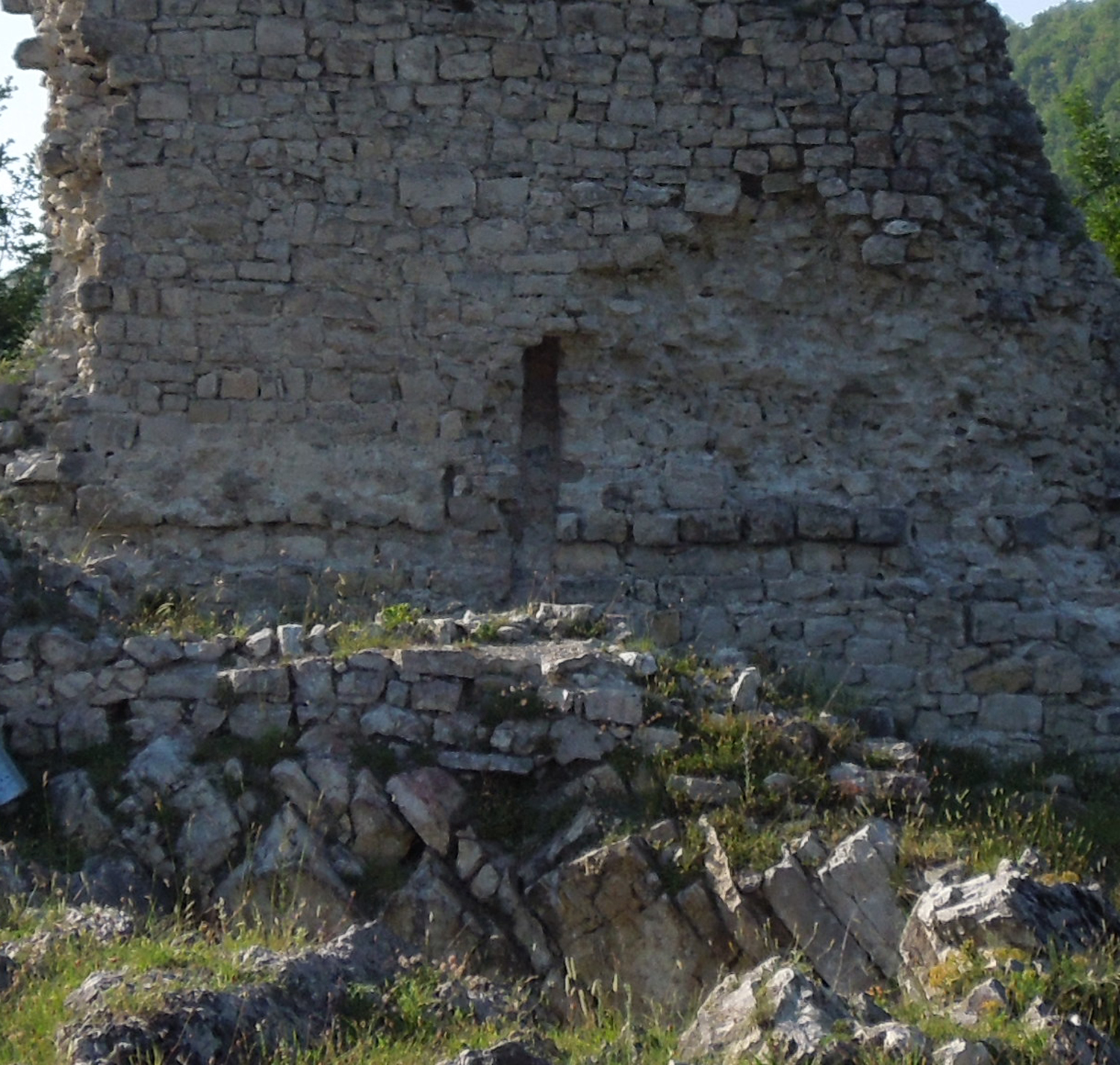
Detail of the probable chimney flue of the Swabian tower.

== Bibliography ==
- Bernardo Cafagna (1996). Fortresses and Castles of the Ascoli Area. La Sfinge Malaspina Edition - Ascoli Piceno, Eco srl-S. Gabriele (TE) Publishing.
- Secondo Balena, Ascoli in Piceno - History of Ascoli and Its Inhabitants, Società Editrice Ricerche s.a.s., Via Faenza 13 Folignano, Ascoli Piceno, Grafiche D'Auria Printing, December 1999 edition, pp. 220–222, ISBN 88-86610-11-4;
- Alessandro Mucciante, Prehistoric Evidence in the S. Maria Scalena Cave in Civitella del Tronto, Museum of the People of Abruzzo - Notebook No. 32, 2000, pp. 88-102.
- Furio Cappelli, At the Borders of the Kingdom: The Fortress of Macchia, 2017
