= Valle Castellana =

- Comune
- Comune di Valle Castellana
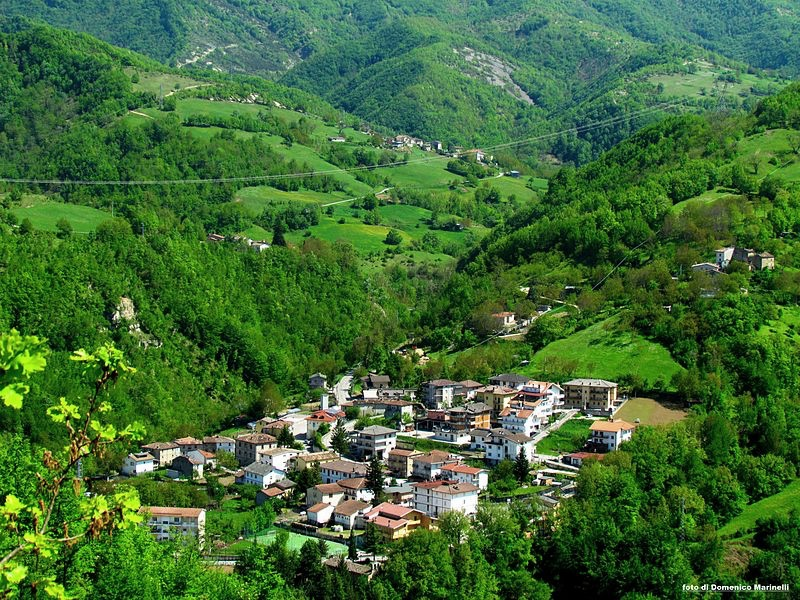

- Coat of arms

- Location within Italy Location within Abruzzo
- Coordinates: 42°44′N 13°30′E
- Country: Italy
- Region: Abruzzo
- Province: Teramo (TE)
- Frazioni: Basto, Casanova, Ceraso, Cerquito, Cerro, Cesano, Colle, Collegrato, Coronelle, Corvino, Fischioli, Fornisco, Laturo, Leofara, Macchia da Borea, Macchia da Sole, Mattere, Morrice, Olmeto, Pascellata, Piano Maggiore, Pietralta, Prevenisco, Rio di Lame, San Giacomo, Santa Rufina, Santo Stefano, San Vito, Settecerri, Stivigliano, Valle Fara, Vallenquina, Valle Pezzata, Valloni, Valzo, Vignatico, Villa Franca

Government
  - Mayor: Vincenzo Esposito

Area
  - Total: 134 km^{2} (52 sq mi)
- Elevation: 625 m (2,051 ft)

Population (1 January 2007)
  - Total: 1,158
  - Density: 8.64/km^{2} (22.4/sq mi)
- Time zone: UTC+1 (CET)
  - Summer (DST): UTC+2 (CEST)
- Postal code: 64010
- Dialing code: 0861
- Patron saint: Maria Santissima Annunziata
- Saint day: 25 March
- Website: Official website

Valle Castellana (Ascolano: I Piana) is a village and comune in the Province of Teramo, in the Abruzzo region of central Italy. It is a member of the Italian community of surrounding mountain villages, Monti della Laga. It is located in the natural park known as the Gran Sasso e Monti della Laga National Park.

== Geography ==
The comune takes its name from the Castellana River, which travels north towards Ascoli Piceno in the Marche region. From here it joins the Tronto River before eventually leading out to the Adriatic Sea.

The comune is bordered by Accumoli, Acquasanta Terme, Amatrice, Arquata del Tronto, Ascoli Piceno, Campli, Civitella del Tronto, Rocca Santa Maria, Torricella Sicura.

== History ==
Some literary scholars have put forth the hypothesis that the Castellano River is the same "fiume Verde" (Verde River) where Manfred of Sicily is claimed to have been buried in the Divine Comedy of Dante. The Castellana River basin, along with the Montagna dei Fiori formed the northernmost portion of the Kingdom of Naples.

== See also ==
- Castel Manfrino
