= Martese =

- Frazione
- Location of Martese in Italy
- Coordinates: 42°40′41″N 13°31′18″E
- Country: Italy
- Region: Abruzzo
- Province: Teramo (TE)
- Comune: Rocca Santa Maria
- Elevation: 997 m (3,271 ft)

Population
  - Total: 0
- Demonym: Martesi
- Time zone: UTC+1 (CET)
  - Summer (DST): UTC+2 (CEST)
- Postal code: 64010
- Dialing code: (+39) 0861

Martese is a "frazione" (hamlet) in the commune of Rocca Santa Maria in the Province of Teramo, Italy.

== Geography ==
The village sits at an elevation of approximately 3,270 ft (1,000 m) above sea level. The distance by car to Rocca Santa Maria is less than one mile. The infrequently used road between these two towns is steep and rather primitive. It can be found just off the provincial highway (SP 48) that leads from Teramo to Ceppo via Rocca Santa Maria and Bosco Martese. The old town center is composed of a small cluster of houses. As was the custom of the day a small church sits nearby and off to itself.

Martese can be found at the top of a promontory overlooking the high Tordino Valle and lies in the heart of the Abruzzo territory known as Monti della Laga within the Italian Gran Sasso e Monti della Laga National Park. From the town center one can see the two mountain chains that run through this rugged area.

== History ==
In the waning days of feudalism, the Bishopric of Teramo came to have a great many land holdings in the area which were collectively known as the State of Bisegno. These church holdings were divided into thirteen communes, each of which at the time referred to as a Università. One of these was Rocca Santa Maria. The Rocca Santa Maria commune was composed of 16 small villages as follows: Canili (pop 31); Fustagnano (pop 25); Martisi (today Martese, pop 62); Taudero (today Tavolero, pop 160), Colle (pop 29); Ciarelli (pop 380), Paranisi (today Paranesi, pop 34), Alvelli (pop 19), Luciano (today Licciano, pop 32); Fiume (pop 50); Riano (pop 69); Tevere (pop 33); Cesa (pop 37); Castiglione (pop 6); Fioli (pop 150); and Forno (pop 150).

In 1804 Martese had 62 inhabitants. In 1813 the village, previously part of the feudal holding of Rocca Santa Maria, remained under the jurisdiction of Rocca Santa Maria when it became a commune in the Province of Teramo. By 1841 the population of Martese had fallen to 55. Today the village is a ghosttown and awaits revitalization.

== Project Borghi (Burgs) ==
Martese today is one of three villages (the other two being Serra and Tavolero) chosen by the Province of Teramo as sites for future touristic development. As part of this large-scale project, data related to the architectural, environment, and touristic aspects of more than 50 nearby villages and locals were systematically gathered and painstakingly analyzed before deciding upon the exact locations to be developed. These three villages were chosen for their authenticity, representativeness, and overall potential with regard to the criteria that had been established by the provincial authorities.

== Bibliography ==
- Luigi Ercole, Dizionario topografico alfabetico della provincia di Teramo, Berardo Carlucci e Compagni, Teramo, 1804, p. 109; e in ristampa dell'editore Arnaldo Forni, Bologna, 1984;
- Paesi abbandonati: contributo al recupero del patrimonio edilizio dei Monti della Laga, a cura di Giovanni Di Marco, Lucio Di Blasio, Sabatino Fratini, Associazione Gandhi, EGI, Teramo, Edigrafital, 1991, pp. 138–141;
