= Castellano (river) =

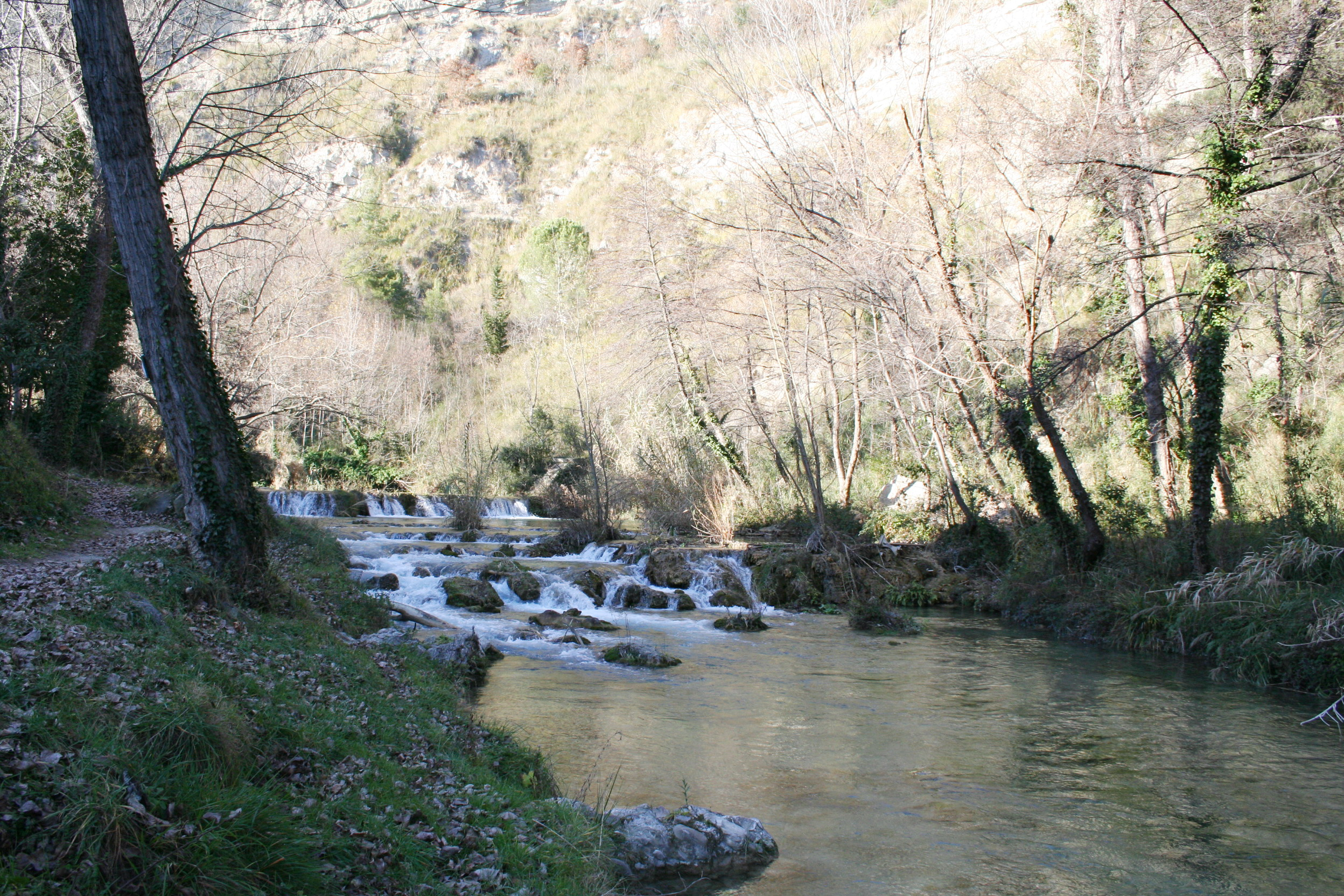
- Castellano

Location
- Country: Italy

Physical characteristics
- Source
  - location: Monti della Laga
  - elevation: 1,900 m (6,200 ft)
- Mouth: Tronto
  - location: Ascoli Piceno
  - coordinates: 42°51′24″N 13°35′01″E
- Length: 40 km (25 mi)
- Discharge
  - average: 3 m^{3}/s (110 cu ft/s)

Basin features
- Progression: Tronto→ Adriatic Sea

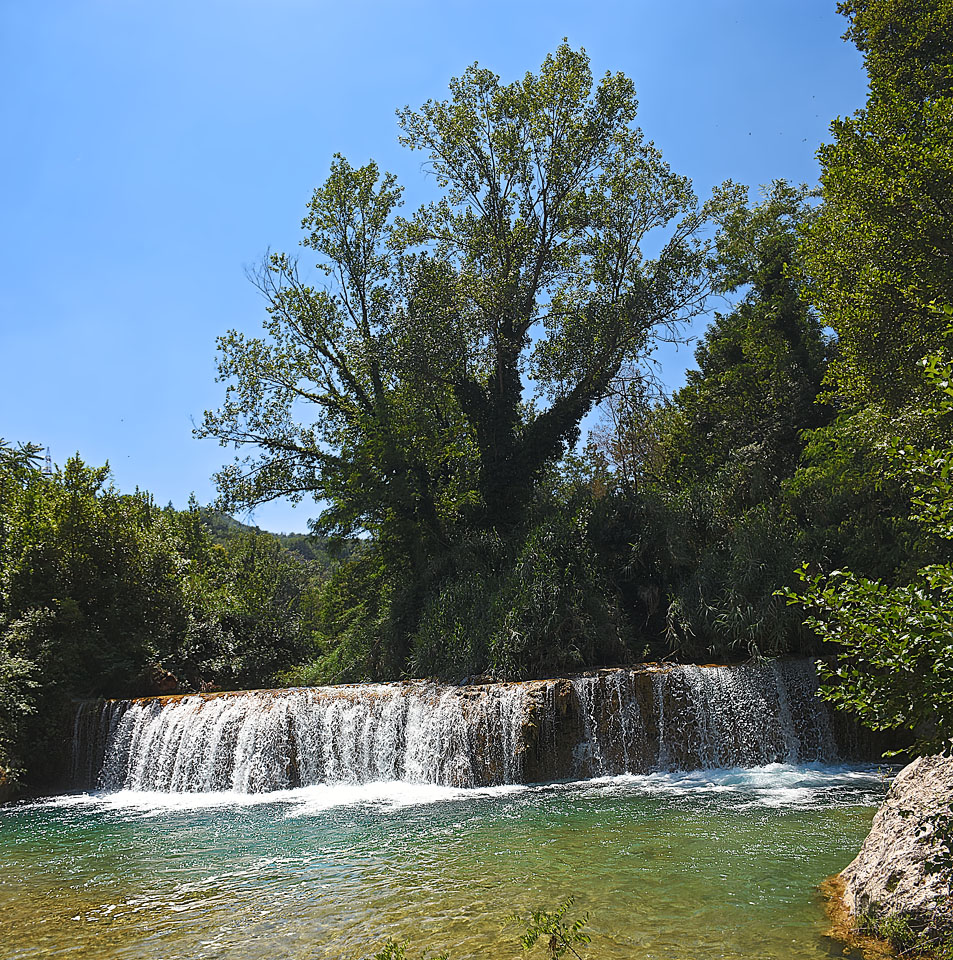
Castellano river near Ascoli Piceno

The Castellano is a river in Italy. Its source is in the Monti della Laga mountains near the border between the province of Teramo and the province of Rieti north of Monte Gorzano. It flows northeast through the mountains in the province of Teramo and eventually forms the border between the province of Teramo and the province of Ascoli Piceno. The river flows west of Monte dei Fiori before entering the province of Ascoli Piceno. The river joins the Tronto at Ascoli Piceno.
