= Serra, Rocca Santa Maria =

Serra
- Frazione
- Location of Serra in Italy
- Coordinates: 42°41′13″N 13°31′59″E
- Country: Italy
- Region: Abruzzo
- Province: Teramo (TE)
- Comune: Rocca Santa Maria
- Elevation: 1,096 m (3,596 ft)

Population (2007)
  - Total: 1
- Demonym: Serresi
- Time zone: UTC+1 (CET)
  - Summer (DST): UTC+2 (CEST)
- Postal code: 64010
- Dialing code: 0861

Serra is an Italian village and frazione of the Commune of Rocca Santa Maria in the Province of Teramo, Abruzzo, Italy. The village sits at an elevation of 3596 feet above sea level in the area of Monti della Laga within the Gran Sasso e Monti della Laga National Park.

== History ==
=== Overview ===
The village likely takes its name from the word sèrrə which in the local dialect means crest. The location of Serra is in fact on a high elevation overlooking the Vezzola river.

In previous times the village belonged to the Università (a medieval term typically referring to several small clusters of dwellings) of the village of Rocca Bisegna. Others areas sharing this distinction included Faiete-Cona Faiete, San Biagio, Pomarolo and Macchia Santa Cecilia. In a book published in 1804 by Luigi Ercole the village is listed as having 38 inhabitants. By 1841 this figure had swelled to 44. In 2007 Serra had but one sole remaining citizen.

The village has an elongated shape and the only remaining houses face the one road that runs through its center. Although they have not yet come to fruition, plans are underway to restore several of the old historic dwellings and perhaps build a resort hotel nearby.

=== Historical notes ===
- In 1124 the Totoneschi family were granted rights to landholdings in the area by the local Catholic Church.
- In 1270 documents refer to the involvement of Giacomo di Serris in the renting of this land area.
- In 1279 a land transaction occurred regarding the local Church of San Salvatore. One individual involved in this transaction was Tommaso di Berardo of Serra Stephanesca.
- In 1813 Serra is listed as belonging to the università of Rocca di Bisegno

== Traditions ==
During the Feast of the Assumption many people gather at Serra for a religious celebration. The participants gather on foot and form a procession to the San Salvatore Church. During this activity the marchers gather all of the snails that they encounter along the way as these are believed to contain the souls of the deceased remaining in Purgatory. The snails are then blessed by the priest, thereby absolving the spirits of their previously-committed earthly sins. After the religious ceremonies a great feast is enjoyed by all.

== The Church of San Salvatore ==
Just before entering the town the Church of San Salvatore can be found a somewhat higher elevation. The church was renovated in the first half of the 19th century. It sits upon the ruins of a previous structure which bore the same name. In the past, a religious festival took place each year on 9 November. In days past another holiday celebration would take place in the month of May.

== Project Borghi (Burgs) ==
Serra today is one of three villages (the other two being Martese and Tavolero) chosen by the Province of Teramo as sites for future touristic development. As part of this large-scale project data related to the architectural, environment, and touristic aspects of more than 50 nearby villages and locals were systematically gathered and painstakingly analyzed before deciding upon the exact locations to be developed. These three villages were chosen for their authenticity, representativeness, and overall potential with regard to the criteria that had been established by the provincial authorities.

== Bibliography ==
- Luigi Ercole, Dizionario topografico alfabetico della provincia di Teramo, Berardo Carlucci e Compagni, Teramo, 1804, p. 108; e in ristampa dell'editore Arnaldo Forni, Bologna, 1984. (In Italian)
- Paesi abbandonati: contributo al recupero del patrimonio edilizio dei Monti della Laga, a cura di Giovanni Di Marco, Lucio Di Blasio, Sabatino Fratini, Associazione Gandhi, EGI, Teramo, Edigrafital, 1991, pp. 142–146. (In Italian)
- Serra, in La valle dell'alto Vomano e dei Monti della Laga, Teramo, Fondazione Cassa di Risparmio della Provincia di Teramo, 1991, (Documenti dell’Abruzzo teramano, serie 3, collana diretta da Luisa Franchi dell’Orto), vol. III-2, pp. 545–546. (In Italian)
