= Monti Gemelli =

Mountains in Italy

Coordinates: 42°45′49″N 13°35′53″E

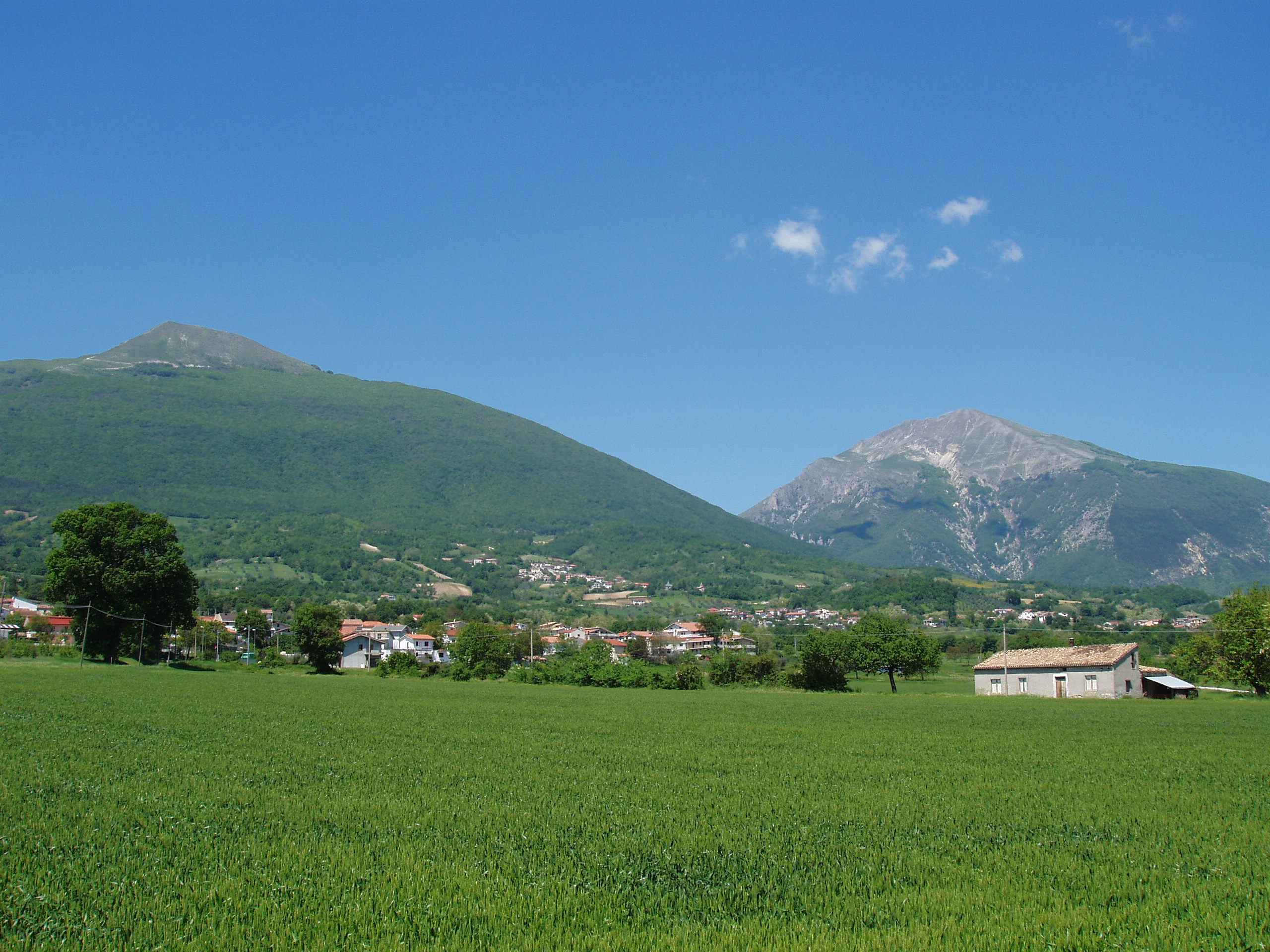
View of Monti Gemelli

Monti Gemelli (Twin Mountains) is the name given to two similar mountains, Montagna dei Fiori and Montagna di Campli, in the Abruzzo region of Italy. They are located in the Province of Teramo.

== Description ==
The two peaks are located on the eastern side of the Monti della Laga mountain range, and they are separated by a gorge carved by the Salinello stream. The northern mountain, Montaga dei Fiori, has a slope descending into the Province of Ascoli Piceno. These mountains are also associated with the herb Field Wort (known in Latin as herba gentiana) which, according to the Pseudo-Apuleius Herbal, is useful against snake bite.

== See also ==
- Monti della Laga
- Apennine Mountains
- Herbarium Apuleii Platoni
