= Tordino =

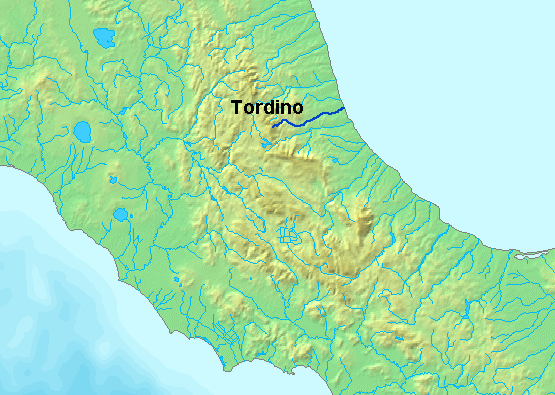

Location
- Country: Italy

Physical characteristics
- Source
  - location: Monti della Laga, Abruzzo
  - elevation: 1,996 m (6,549 ft)
- Mouth: Adriatic Sea
  - coordinates: 42.7401°N 13.9801°E
- Length: 59 km (37 mi)

The Tordino is a river flowing in the province of Teramo, in the Abruzzo region of central Italy. In Roman times it may have been known as "Batinus".

The source of the Tordino is located between Monte Gorzano and Pelone, in the Monti della Laga subchain of the Apennines. After a course of 58 kilometres (36 miles), it flows into the Adriatic Sea. The river initially flows in a torrent to the east through the Gran Sasso National Park, then directs to the north around Mount Bilanciere before flowing in a south-easterly direction. The river curves northward near Torricella Sicura and flows past Teramo. The river flows northeast past San Nicolò a Tordino and Castellalto before flowing into the Adriatic Sea near Giulianova and Cologna Spiaggia.

Near its source, the Tordino forms the Fiumata cascades and, a bit further along, the Tordino cascades. It then passes through Padula and Caiano, frazioni of the comune of Cortino. Watermills and olive oil presses are located in the higher elevations. The town of Teramo is located at the junction where the Tordino meets the Vezzola river. The mouth of the rivers is in the town of Giulianova. The Tordino river basin covers an area of approximately 453 square kilometres (175 square miles).

Tributaries on the left bank of the Tordino include the protective irrigation drain known as the Cavata (including three terraces and their associated cascades near the source of the Tordino), the Rivettino, the Castiglione, the Rivoletto, the Rio Verde, the large ditch known as "The Inferno," the 9-kilometre-long (5.6-mile) Fiumicino stream, and the Vezzola river. A large portion of the water of the Vezzola (which begins near the town of Rocca Santa Maria, has a length of 19 kilometres (12 miles), and passes through the Torricella Sicura community) is used by the ENEL (Ente Nazionale per l'Energia Elettrica) utility company to produce electricity.

Tributaries on the right bank of the Tordino include the Movese and Elce irrigation drains. Also located on the side is a stream known as the Fiumicello, this being formed by the runoff from the slopes of Mount Bilanciere.
