= Padula, Cortino =

Padula
- Frazione
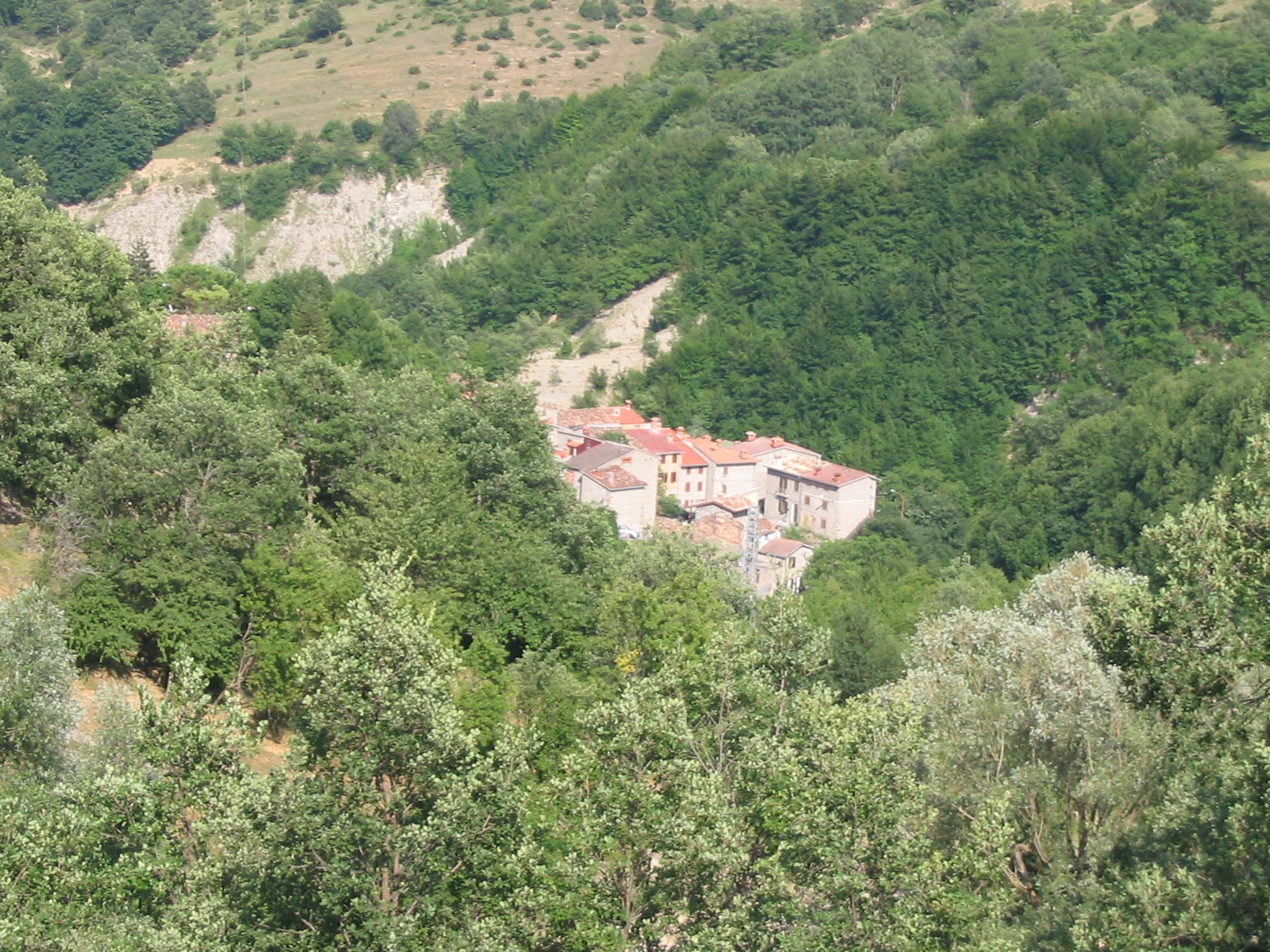
- View of Padula

- Location of Padula in Italy
- Coordinates: 42°37′00″N 13°28′08″E
- Country: Italy
- Region: Abruzzo
- Province: Teramo (TE)
- Comune: Cortino
- Elevation: 928 m (3,045 ft)

Population (2001)
  - Total: 118
- Time zone: UTC+1 (CET)
  - Summer (DST): UTC+2 (CEST)
- Postal code: 64040
- Dialing code: (+39) 0861

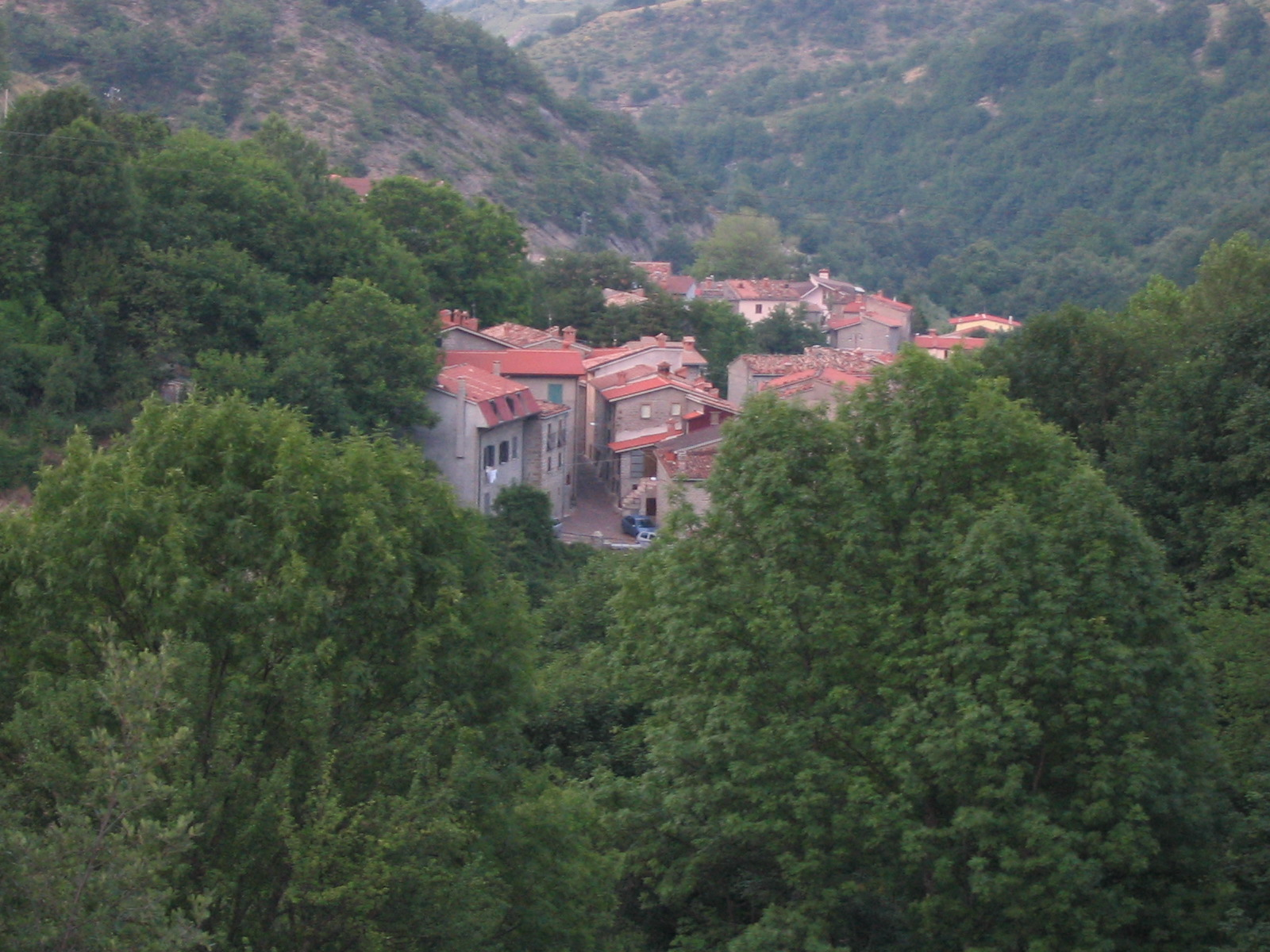
View from Macchiatornella

Padula is a small village in the Province of Teramo, in the Abruzzo region of central Italy. It is a hamlet (frazione) of the commune of Cortino.

== Geography ==
Padula lies about 35 km from the provincial capital of Teramo and stands at an altitude of 928 metres. It falls within Zone "M" of the Parco Nazionale del Gran Sasso e Monti della Laga (National Park of the Gran Sasso and Mount Laga).

The old schoolhouse, now renovated, houses an information and ecological center by the name of I frutti del bosco (Wild Berries).

== History ==
Until taking on the present abbreviated version, Padula, from at least the 12th century onward the town was called "Rocca di Padula" (Fortress of Padula). In 1816 it was annexed by the commune of Cortino.

== Churches ==
The patron of the town is the Blessed Virgin Mary to whom is dedicated the main church in the town, Chiesa di Santa Maria Assunta (Church of Saint Mary of the Assumption). It is noted for its 15th-century frescoes. The church dates back to the 15th century and was restored in the 19th century. Further restorative work was carried out in 1988 at which time it was given the title "Santuario della Madonna dei Monti della Laga" (Sanctuary of the Madonna of Mount Laga). The smaller, Chiesa di Sant'Antonio ("Church of Saint Anthony"), is located in the town center.

== Demographics ==
Fewer than 50 people reside in Padula during the cold winter months. This number increases considerably when many tourists, emigrants, and those with vacation homes return in the warm summer season.

== Festivals and events ==
The main celebrations occur during the summer season:

- mid June — Volksmarch from the village of Ceppo to Padula organized by the WWF
- beginning of August — Mountain trek to the source of the Tordino River
- 15 August (Ferragosto) — Festival of the town patron with games, dancing, and a grand fireworks finale
- end of August — Notte Dei Briganti (Night of the Brigands) grand gastronomic event featuring an enactment through the streets of the town of the adventures of the brigand Marco Sciarra
- beginning of September — Marcia del Lupo (March of the Wolf) organized nature excursion
