= Dellamonica =

Dellamonica is a surname. People with the surname include:

- Nicole Dellamonica
- Madeleine Dellamonica
- A. M. Dellamonica

== See also ==
- Della Monica Castle
