= Ceppo =

Ceppo may refer to:

- Ceppo Morelli, a comune in Verbano-Cusio-Ossola, Piedmont, Italy
- Ceppo (Rocca Santa Maria), a locality near Martese, Teramo, Abruzzo, Italy
- Madonna del Ceppo, a 1452/3 painting by Filippo Lippi
- Ospedale del Ceppo, a medieval hospital in Pistoia, Tuscany, central Italy

== See also ==
- Ceppi (disambiguation)
