= Tavolero =

Coordinates: 42°40′N 13°32′E

Tavolero, (also referred to as Tavolier, Tivolieri, or in ancient Roman times as Tebularium) is a "frazione" (i.e., suburb) of the Communal town of Rocca Santa Maria in the Province of Teramo. It is located in the area known as Monti della Laga and sits within the Gran Sasso e Monti della Laga National Park. The village can be found at an elevation about 2709 feet on a rocky piece of land that juts out over and dominates the nearby Tordino River. In the year 2007 Tavolero is but an uninhabited ghosttown.

Most of the villas in the village date back to the 18th century. One in particular is of major historical significance and was likely constructed in the 15th century. It has an imposing chimney and fireplace and has now been restored for use as a summer vacation home.

== The San Flaviano Church ==
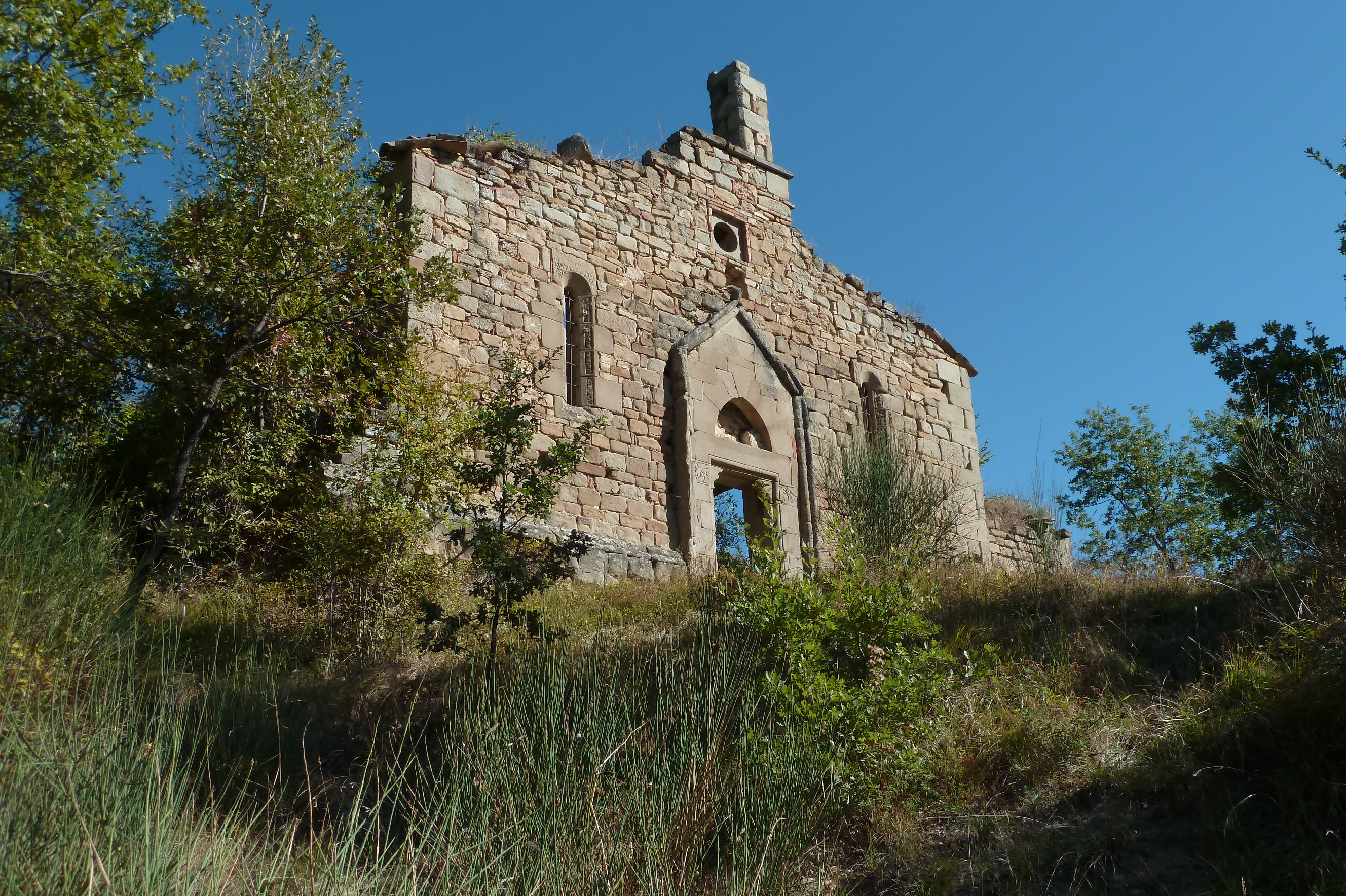

This church is of great historical significance. It likely dates back to the last third of the 13th century and sits alone several hundred meters above the small village below. This placement of the village church is characteristic of other nearby small villages in the area. San Flaviano is built on the foundation of preexisting structure whose origins likely date back to end of the 11th century. Evidence of this can be seen via several inscribed marking stones embedded in the church's front wall and porticoes.

Mention is made of San Flaviano in a document dated 1324 known as the Rationes decimarum. It lists the church as falling within the parish of Rocca Santa Maria which itself formed part of the Diocese of Teramo.

Architectural aspects of the church are characteristic of those features frequently employed by the Order of the Cistercians. The church bears a strong resemblance to another of this order's churches, Santa Maria ad Criptas, located in the Pescara Province town of Fossa and built in the late 13th century. Together they serve as important monuments to the presence of the Cistercians in the Abruzzo Region of Italy. The church of San Flaviano bears a more simplistic wooden beamed roof rather than a more ornate and costly volt. This was likely done in to keep the costs of the church within reason. In medieval times the church was expected to turn over a tenth (la decima) of its revenue to the parish each year.

== The "Borghi" (Burgs) Projects ==
Tavolero, along with the nearby villages of Martese and Serra, has been selected by the Province of Teramo as a site for development as a major tourist center. Emphasis will be placed on restoring the village in a manner that is both authentic and environmentally sound.
