= Lago di Scandarello =

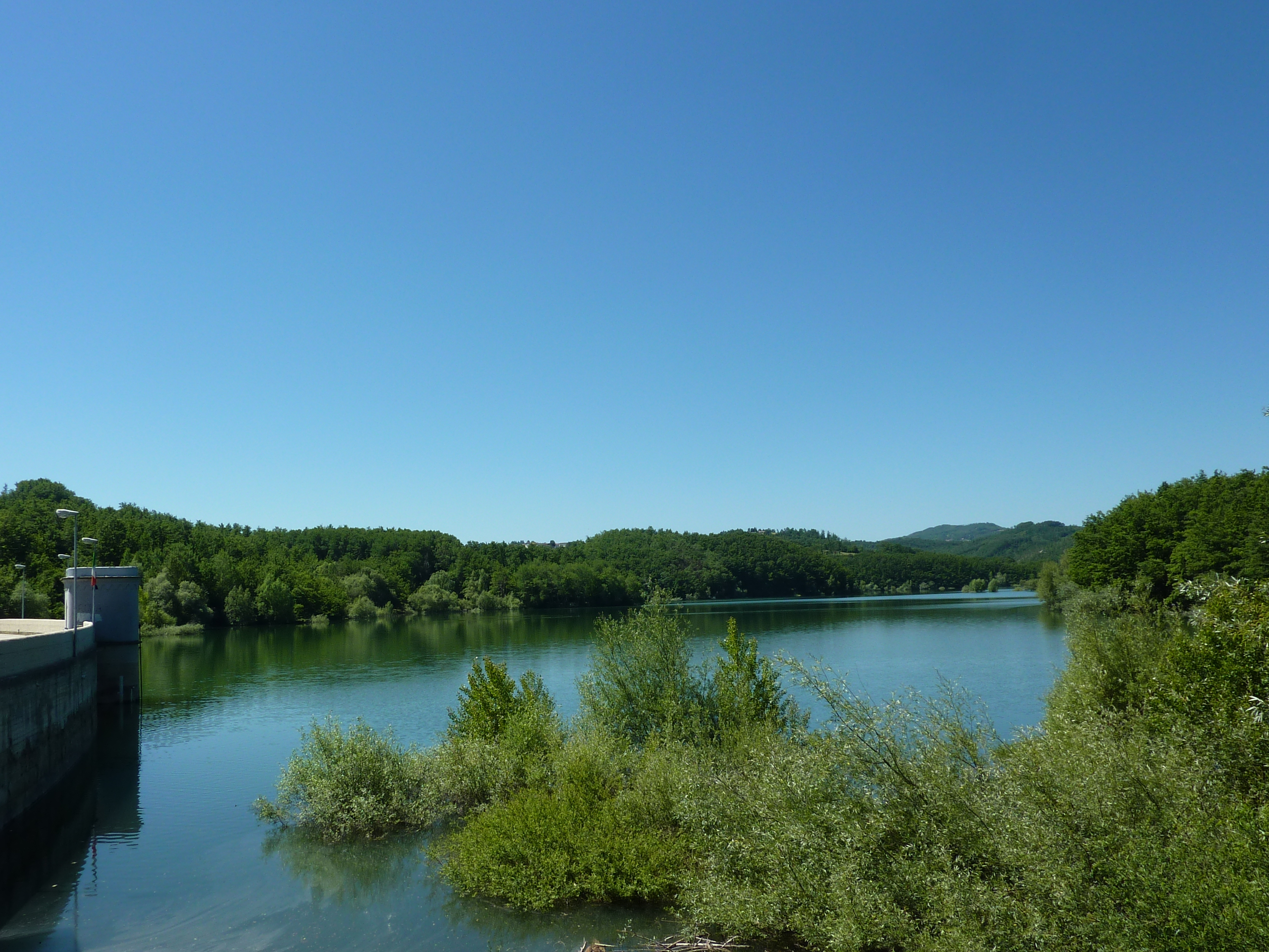
- Lago di Scandarello

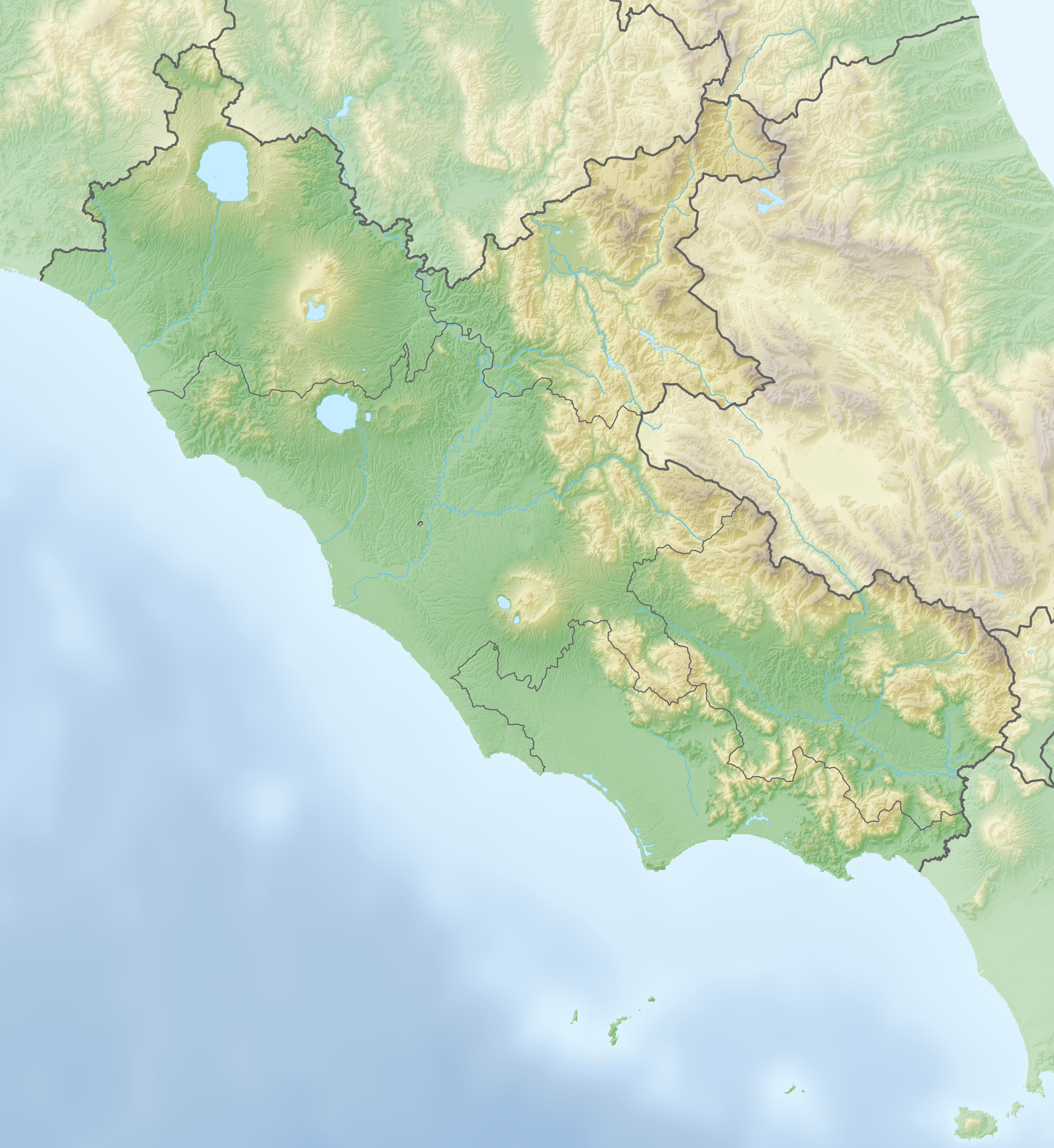
- Location within Lazio
- Location: Province of Rieti, Lazio
- Coordinates: 42.64105°N 13.26956°E
- Type: reservoir
- Primary inflows: Scandarello torrente
- Primary outflows: Scandarello torrente
- Basin countries: Italy
- Max. length: 3 km (1.9 mi)
- Surface area: 1 km^{2} (0.39 sq mi)
- Max. depth: 41 m (135 ft)
- Water volume: 0.012 km^{3} (0.0029 cu mi)
- Surface elevation: 868 m (2,848 ft)

Lago di Scandarello is a reservoir in the Province of Rieti, Lazio, Italy. It was created in 1924 when a dam was built across Scandarello torrente, a tributary of the Tronto. It is near Amatrice. The lake is 3 km long and its surface area is 1 km². The volume of the lake is 0.012 km^{3} and its maximum depth is 41 m. The lake is at an elevation of 868 m above sea level.
