= Salinello =

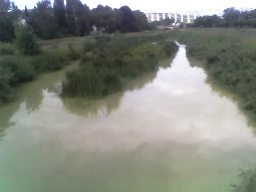
- The Salinello near Tortoreto

Location
- Country: Italy

Physical characteristics
- Source
  - location: Monti della Laga
- Mouth: Adriatic Sea
  - coordinates: 42.7813°N 13.9550°E

The Salinello (Latin: Zerninus) is a river in Italy. It is located in the province of Teramo in the Abruzzo region of southern Italy. The source of the river is in the Monti della Laga range southwest of Montagna dei Fiori. The river flows eastward and curves northeast near Civitella del Tronto. The river then curves southeast near Sant'Egidio alla Vibrata and the border with the province of Ascoli Piceno. Finally, the river flows east near Sant'Omero and enters the Adriatic Sea near Giulianova and Tortoreto Lido.
