= Ceppi =

Ceppi may refer to:

- Čepić or Ceppi, village in Istria, Croatia
- Carlo Ceppi, (1829–1900), Italian architect
- Charles Ceppi (1911–1983), American football player
- Mario Ceppi, one of two people for whom Stadio Rigamonti-Ceppi in Italy is named

== See also ==
- Ceppo (disambiguation)
