= Della Monica Castle =

Coordinates: 42°39′39″N 13°41′41″E

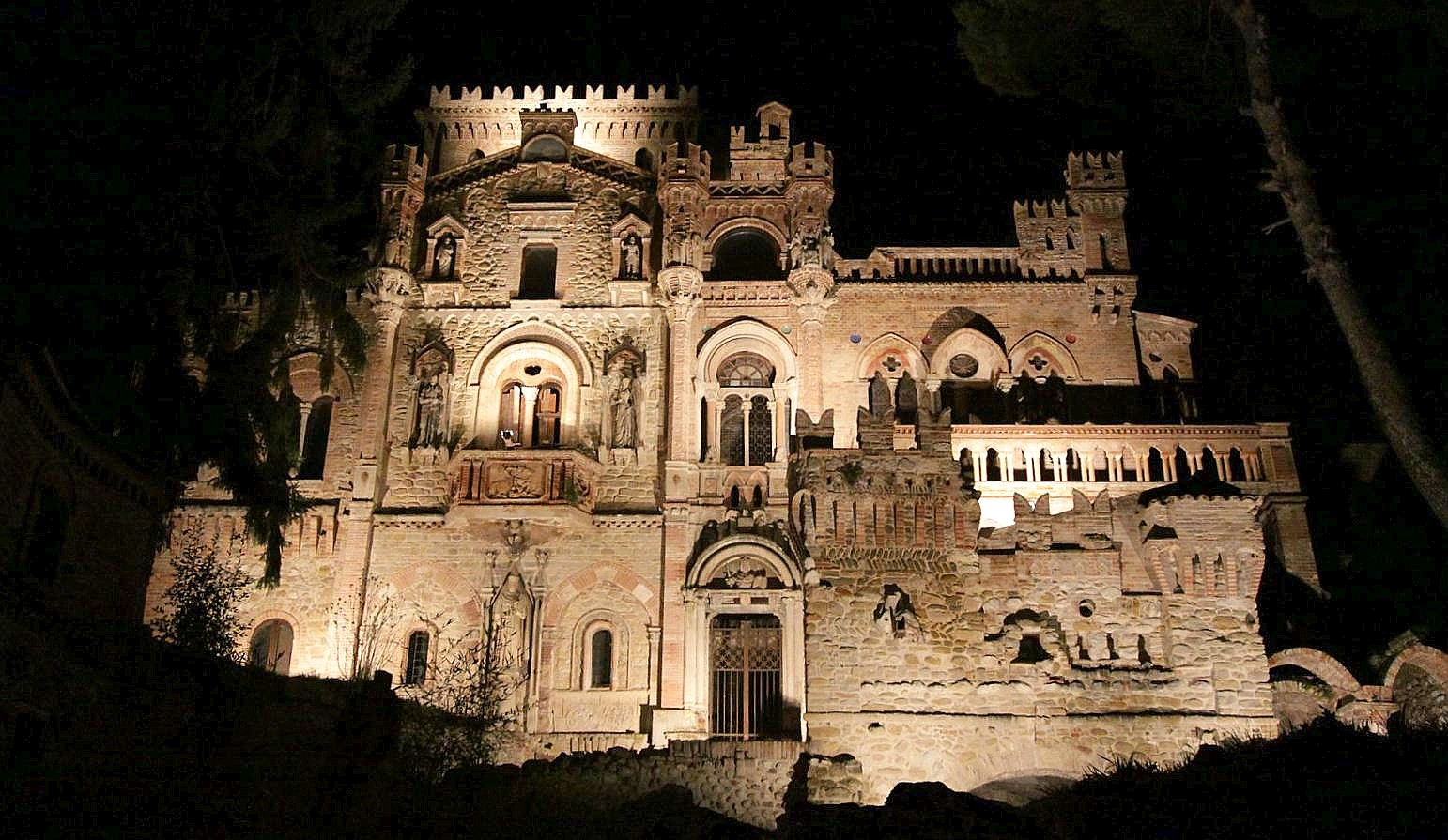
- The main building
- Interactive map of the Della Monica Castle area

General information
- Status: Process of restoration
- Architectural style: Negotic - Moorish
- Location: Abruzzo, Via del Castello; Viale Camillo Benso Cavour, Teramo, ITA
- Year built: 1889 – 1917
- Client: Gennaro Della Monica
- Owner: Comune di Teramo

Della Monica Castle is the main structure in a complex of buildings in the village of Teramo, in the Italian region of Abruzzo. Neo-gothic in style, it was started in 1889 and remained uncompleted at the time of the artist's death in 1917. After his death, Vincenzo Bindi, an art historian, proposed its acquisition by the Municipality as a public museum, however the proposal was immediately shelved. The interior of the castle contains frescoes depicting landscapes and other works by the hand of Gennaro Della Monica, however the area is not open to the public due to it being unsafe.

== Background ==
The medieval village of Teramo is a complex of nineteenth-century buildings built on the hill of San Venanzio, a fusion of different architectural and artistic styles (from negotic to moorish, expressing the eclectic tastes of its creator, Gennaro Della Monica. The main building of the village is Della Monica Castle, whose name also extends to the other buildings and surrounding green areas. It was started in 1889, after the provincial deputation issued the permit "to be able to build a residential casino, parallel to the road to Bosco Martese". In 1890 the walls of the central body had already been erected and the roof covered.

== Della Monica Castle ==
Della Monica Castle is linked to the neo-Gothic taste, in vogue at that time, similar to the castle that belonged to the writer Vincenzo Bonifaci, built at Vallenquina, in the municipality of Valle Castellana, also attributed to Gennaro Della Monica. Cosimo Savastano, reporting the text of a note found among the painter's papers, which read:

"that is not an example of the gothic revival properly said, but it is, for many aspects representative of the figurative-litteraly culture and sensitivity of the 18th and 19th centuries: the complex takes its cue from the eighteenth-century taste for the picturesque, fed on the romantic ideology stimuleted by the rediscovery of the castle [...] (and the Middle Ages)[...] all in shapes and decorations drawn with great freedom and inventivenes from the gothic repertoire with moorish contaminations."

After the death of Della Monica, which took place in 1917, Vincenzo Bindi, an art historian born in Giulianova, was the first to propose its acquisition by the Municipality to allocate it to the seat of the civic museum. The proposal, however, criticized by many parties, was immediately shelved. Since the Second World War, the Castle has been increasingly surrounded by houses which have ended up completely hiding its profile.

Currently, the interior of the castle cannot be visited because it is unsafe, but it is full of frescoes depicting landscapes and other works by the hand of Gennaro Della Monica. He lived in the Castle and set up his studio there, collecting an enormous amount of notes, studies and drawings, made during the completion of the interior and the entire complex.

== Bibliography ==
- Primoli, Fabrizio (2005). Il Castello Della Monica. Storia e struttura del complesso. Teramo: Associazione di Quartiere "Il Castello". Archived from the original on 2022-01-23.
- Savastano, Cosimo (2004). Gennaro Della Monica, 1836-1917. Sant'Atto di Teramo: Edigrafital. pp. 44–45.
