= Faieto =

Coordinates: 42°37′N 13°34′E

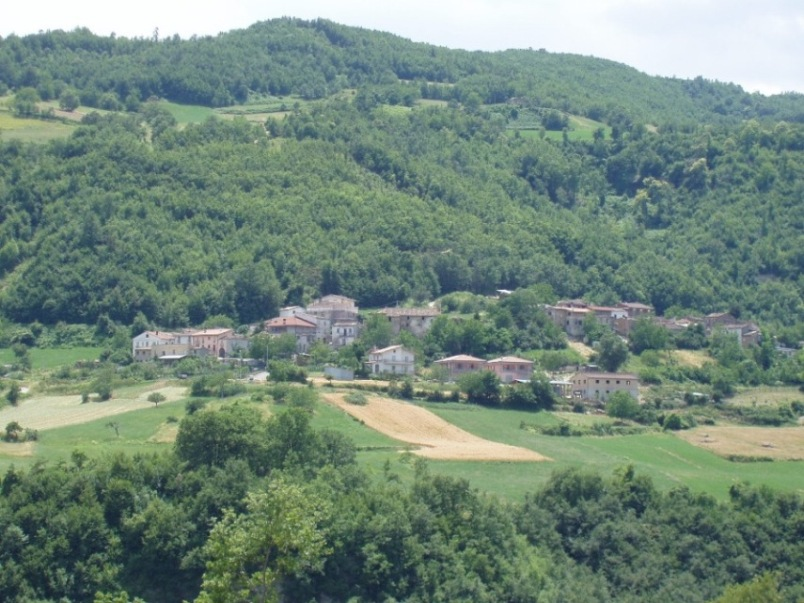
Faieto

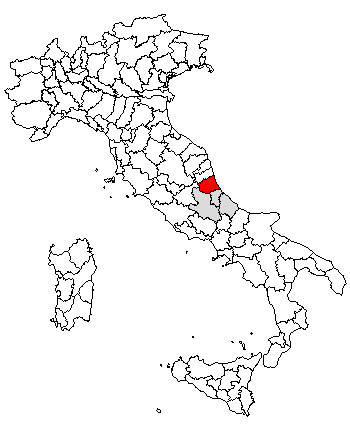
Location of the province of Teramo

Faieto is a suburb (frazione) of the nearby communal city, Cortino, in the Italian Province of Teramo. It lies at an altitude of about 2070 feet above sea level.

== History ==
Faieto takes its name from the many stands of beech trees on the village outskirts. It remains a mystery as to how these trees came to be in this exact location of the Province of Teramo. In any event, it is likely that in the years just prior to the end of the first century AD, the people of the Vomano, Tordino and surrounding valleys took refuge here from the raids and incursions of the Saracens and other barbarians.

Written records concerning the history of Faieto are scarce. According to oral histories, the town at one time was located on the opposite, left bank of the stream known as the Fiumicello, a tributary of the Tordino River. In present times it is situated on the right bank. One reason postulated for this change in location relates to a seventeenth century landslide that destroyed all of the houses of the town. A competing explanation attributes this event to an earthquake sometime around the year 1703 that struck the nearby Gran Sasso region.

At one time Faieto was administered by the commune of Valle San Giovanni. After the unification of Italy, the citizens of Faieto, along with several neighboring villages, petitioned a modification of their borders. This request was granted by the Prefect of Teramo on 16 May 1868. This resulted in the transfer of Faieto, along with the neighboring village of Casanova to the commune of Cortino.

The De Ambrosiis, D'Andrea, Brunozzi families have roots in Faieto dating back many centuries.

== Churches ==
Just above the town in the "Piano delle Macchie", was a charitable institution under the Franciscans from the Sanctuary of Our Mother of Grace in Teramo, which served as a hospitality point along a path from Frondarola to Piano Roseto.

In 1614 to 1624, a new parish, Sant'Andrea di Faieto, was created. By 1640, it was constructed and further delineated the town of Faieto from that of Casanova. The church was adorned with items donated by members of the order of the Franciscan Fathers. The original constructed church had only one side altar, but an 1880 expansion added a new presbytery. At the side altar hangs a painting representing the Sacred Family.

In 1930s renovations were carried out inside the church, and in 1937 frescoes on the ceiling were restored to their original beauty. The main altar and balusters are constructed of granite, an arduous undertaking, since the heavy building materials had to be transported in pieces on the backs of mules from Valle San Giovanni as no paved roads existed at that time. Above the front of the church, in an open bell tower, are two church bells of differing dimensions; the smaller of the two was recast in 1890.

As of 2024, the church, also known as Chiesa Sant'Andrea Apostolo, or in English, the Church of St. Andrew the Apostle, is still an active Roman Catholic Latin Rite parish in the Diocese of Teramo-Atri. Traditionalist Catholics criticized the local bishop, who refused to allow the Tridentine Mass to be heard in the parish.

== Culinary traditions ==
Faieto is famous for its cuisine and culinary traditions. There is an annual chestnut cooking festival in October.

== Bibliography ==
- Giulio Di Nicola, Paesi d'Abruzzo, Bologna, Arnaldo Forni editore, 1981.
- Niccola Palma, Storia ecclesiastica e civile della città e diocesi di Teramo, vol. II, cap. LXV.
