= Monte Gorzano =

Mountain in Italy

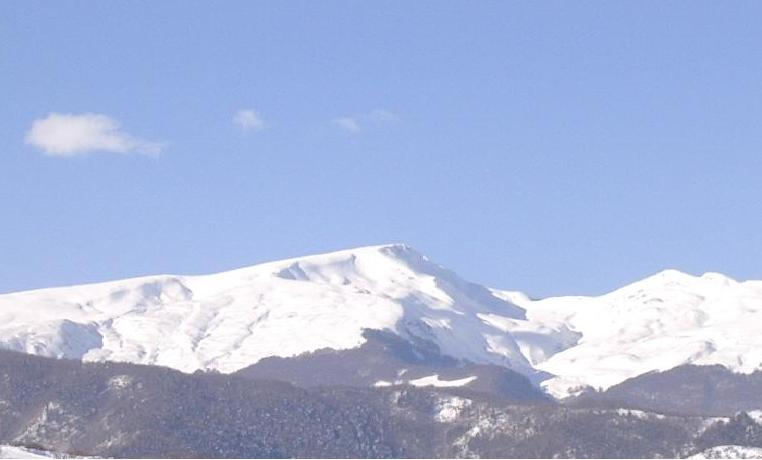

Highest point
- Elevation: 2,458 m (8,064 ft)
- Prominence: 1,183 m (3,881 ft)
- Isolation: 16.6 km (10.3 mi)
- Listing: Ribu
- Coordinates: 42°37′04″N 13°23′47″E

Geography
- Location within Italy
- Location: Abruzzo / Abruzzo, Italy
- Parent range: Monti della Laga (central Apennines)

Monte Gorzano is the highest peak in the Monti della Laga, in northern Abruzzo, central Italy. It has an elevation of 2,458 metres (8,064 ft) and is also the highest peak of Lazio. It is located on the boundary with the provinces of Teramo in the Abruzzo region and Rieti in the Lazio region. The source of the Tordino is near Monte Gorzano (Fiumata).

== See also ==
- Parco Nazionale del Gran Sasso e Monti della Laga
- List of Italian regions by highest point
