= Campovalano =

Coordinates: 42°43′43″N 13°39′46″E

- Frazione
- Interactive map of Campovalano
- Country: Italy
- Region: Abruzzo
- Province: Teramo
- Time zone: UTC+1 (CET)
  - Summer (DST): UTC+2 (CEST)

Campovalano is part of the municipality of Campli, in the Province of Teramo in the Abruzzo region of Italy.

== Necropolis of Campovalano ==
In the small town of Campovalano, there is one of the most important necropolis of Central Italy, with tombs dating from the 10th century BC (late Bronze Age) until the 2nd century BC (Roman conquest). These tombs were used by pre-Italic populations, the ‘Pretuzi’ (Pretuttii), a small tribe belonging to the larger group of ‘Piceni’ (Picenian) who were mainly living of their pastoral life.

Until now the archaeologists have excavated around 680 tombs and these excavations have made it possible to ascertain the great size of the necropolis and the wealth of the tombs. (According to the recent research, there shall be 20,000 tombs still uncovered).
