= Montagna dei Fiori =

Mountain in Italy

- Location within Italy

Highest point
- Elevation: 1,814 m (5,951 ft)
- Coordinates: 42°45′49″N 13°36′03″E

Geography
- Location: Abruzzo, Marche, Italy
- Parent range: Monti della Laga (part of the central Apennines)

Montagna dei Fiori (Italian: "Mountain of the Flowers") is a mountain group in the Abruzzo, central Italy, forming the Monti Gemelli massif, together with the Montagna di Campli. It is located nearby the boundary between the province of Teramo and the Marche region; due to its proximity to Ascoli Piceno, it is also known as Montagna d'Ascoli.

The highest peak is the Monte Girella, at 1,814 m above the sea level.

Geological surveys have discovered the K/T boundary exposed on Montagne dei Fiore .

The mountain, at an elevation of 1,110 m, is home to the hamlet of San Giacomo, a frazione of Valle Castellana and one of the main ski resorts in the area.
