= Cortino =

- Comune
- Comune di Cortino
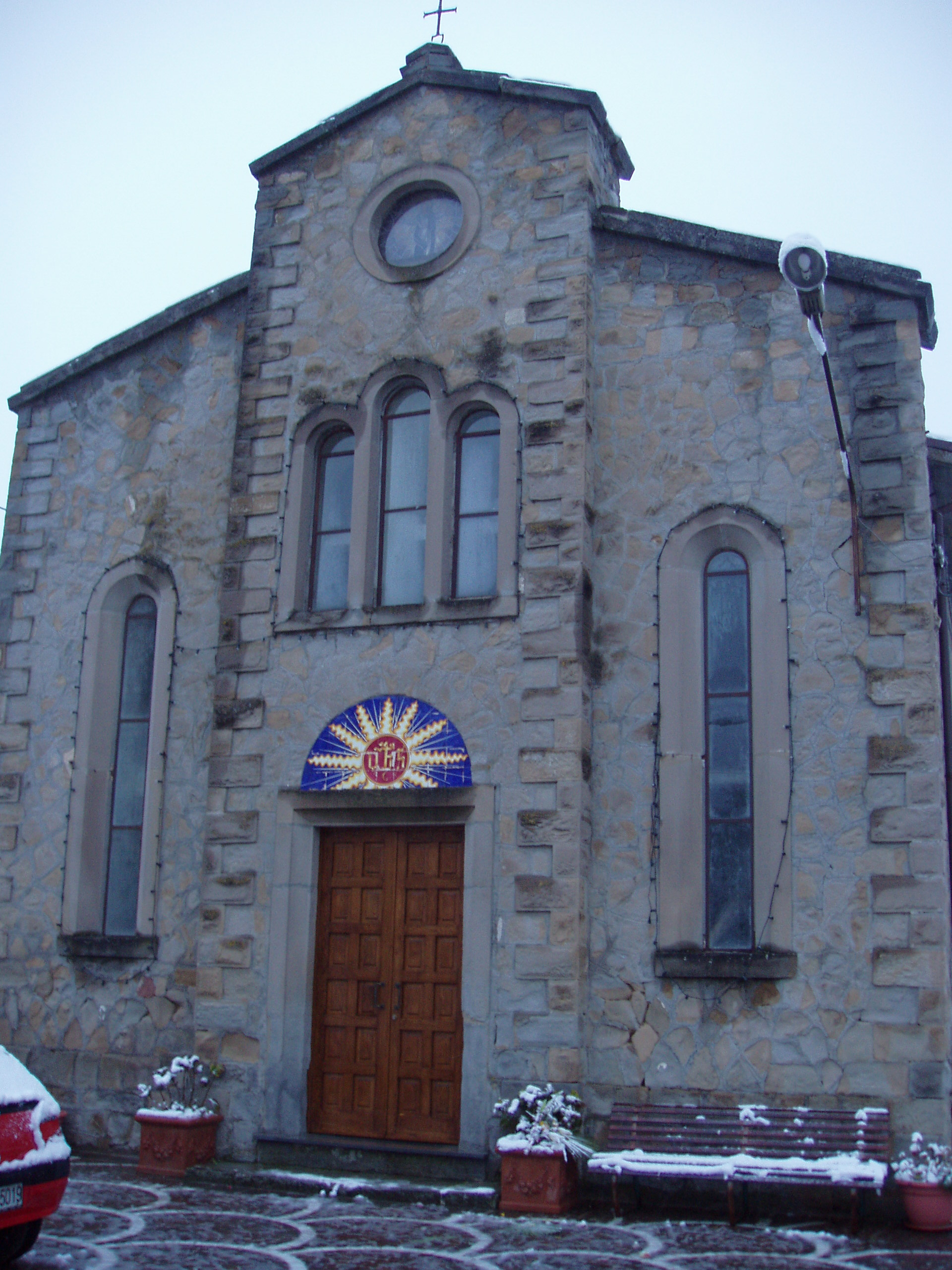

- Coat of arms

- Location within Italy Location within Abruzzo
- Coordinates: 42°38′N 13°33′E
- Country: Italy
- Region: Abruzzo
- Province: Teramo (TE)

Government
  - Mayor: Gabriele Minosse

Area
  - Total: 62 km^{2} (24 sq mi)
- Elevation: 892 m (2,927 ft)

Population (1 January 2009)
  - Total: 731
  - Density: 12/km^{2} (31/sq mi)
- Time zone: UTC+1 (CET)
  - Summer (DST): UTC+2 (CEST)
- Postal code: 64040
- Dialing code: 0861

Cortino (Abruzzese: Curtènë) is a small town and comune in the central Italian region of Abruzzo in the Province of Teramo. It is located in the Gran Sasso e Monti della Laga National Park.

The major part of the population lives in small hamlets dotting the comune. In recent years the population of Cortino has been decreasing as people have moved to larger and more developed Teramo.

The Cortino communal archives were almost completely destroyed in 1943. Prior to 1816, when it was still part of the Kingdom of the Two Sicilies, Cortino was one of 29 mountain villages which formed the "Stato di Roseto", in what was then known as Abruzzo Ulteriore I, known today as the Province of Teramo. Administrative changes took place in 1868, after the unification of Italy, when the communal status of Valle San Giovanni was abolished. Collegilesco, Casanova, and Faieto were at that time annexed into the Comune of Cortino.

== See also ==
- Faieto
