= Rocca Santa Maria =

- Comune
- Comune di Rocca Santa Maria
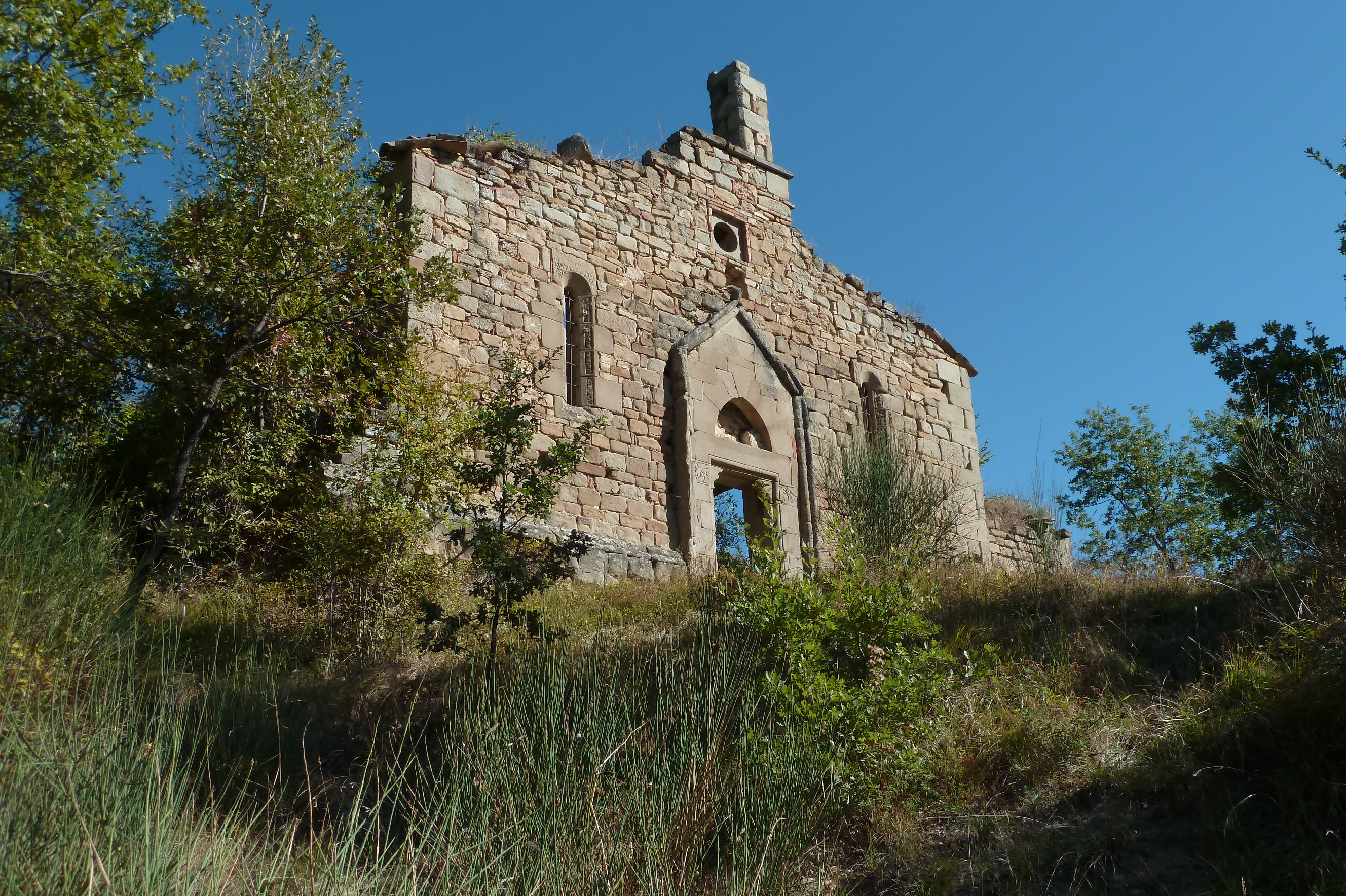

- Coat of arms

- Location within Italy Location within Abruzzo
- Coordinates: 42°41′N 13°32′E
- Country: Italy
- Region: Abruzzo
- Province: Province of Teramo (TE)
- Frazioni: Acquaratola, Alvelli, Belvedere, Canili, Ceppo, Cesa, Castiglione, Ciarelli, Colle, Cona Faiete, Faiete, Fioli, Fiume, Forno, Fustagnano, Imposte (municipal seat), Licciano, Macchia Santa Cecilia, Martese, Paranesi, Pomarolo, Riano, San Biagio, Serra, Tavolero, Tevere.

Government
  - Mayor: Stefania Guerrieri

Area
  - Total: 61 km^{2} (24 sq mi)
- Elevation: 1,073 m (3,520 ft)

Population (1 January 2007)
  - Total: 632
  - Density: 10/km^{2} (27/sq mi)
- Demonym: Roccolani
- Time zone: UTC+1 (CET)
  - Summer (DST): UTC+2 (CEST)
- Postal code: 64010
- Dialing code: 0861
- Patron saint: Saint Lawrence
- Saint day: 10 August
- Website: Official website

Rocca Santa Maria is a town and comune in the province of Teramo, Abruzzo, eastern Italy. It is located in the Gran Sasso e Monti della Laga National Park. The municipal seat is in the frazione of Imposte.

== See also ==
- Martese
- Serra (Rocca Santa Maria)
