= Monti della Laga =

Mountain range in Italy

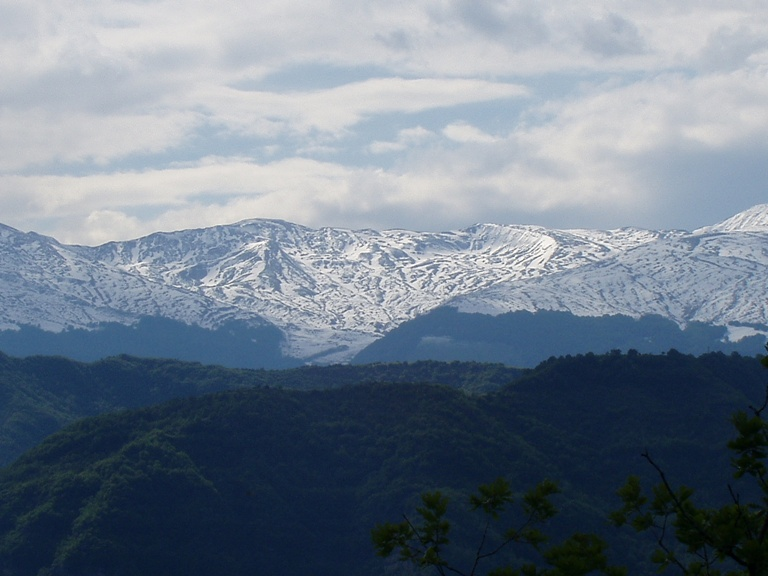
- Monti della Laga as seen from the Province of Teramo

Highest point
- Elevation: 2,458 m (8,064 ft)

Naming
- Language of name: Italian

Geography
- Location within Italy
- Location: Lazio, Italy
- Parent range: Apennines

Monti della Laga is a mountain range in the central Apennines of Italy.

== Fauna ==
Living in this mountainous zone are numerous species of wild animals including the Apennine wolf, deer, badgers, and the extremely rare Marsican brown bear. Among insects the butterfly Erebia pandrose has in these mountains its sole Apennine population.

== See also ==
- Gran Sasso
- Valle Piola
