= History of Pescara =

History of the municipality of Pescara, Italy

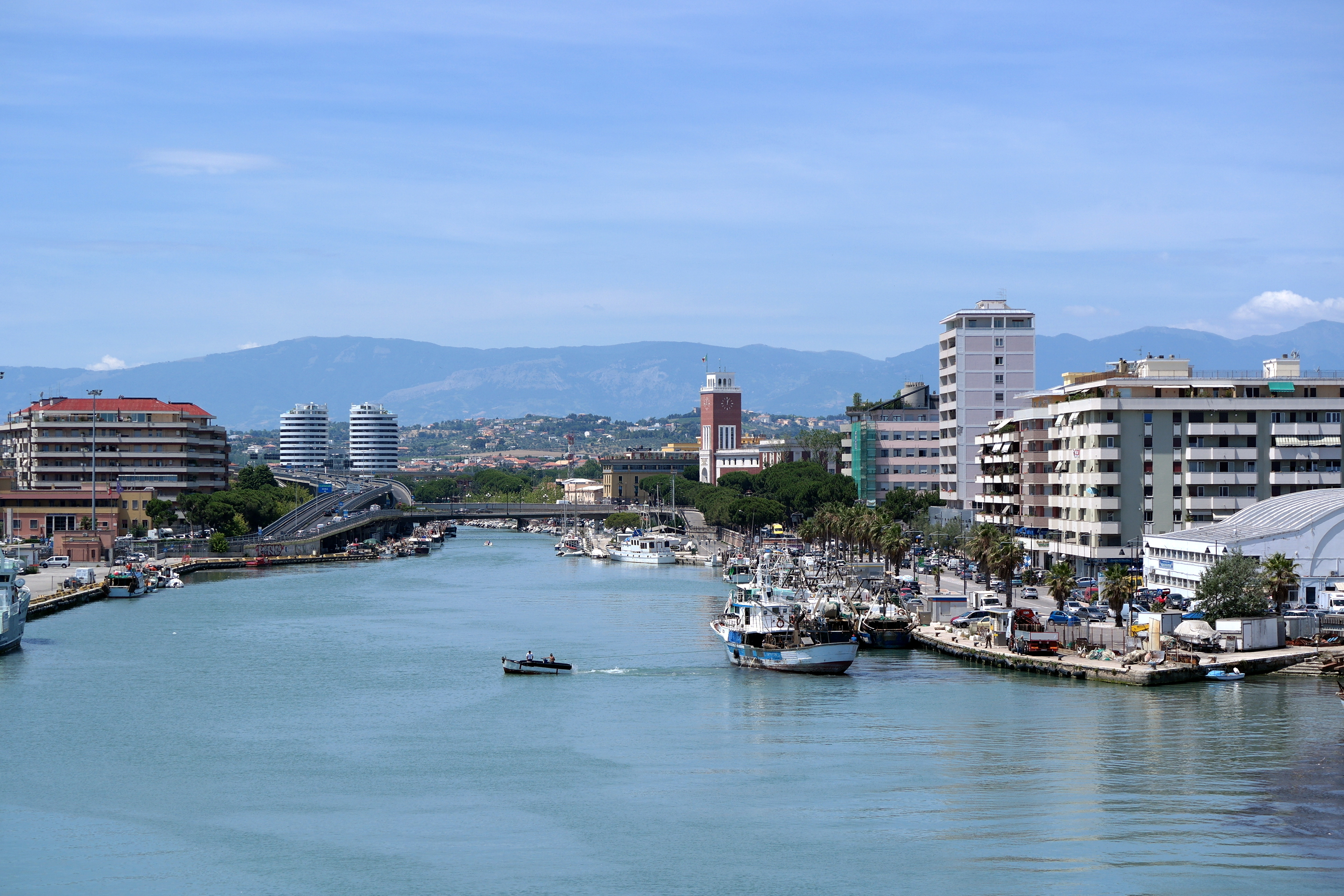
Overview of the river port

The history of Pescara begins in the Italic period due to its geographically advantageous position as a hub for communication routes between ancient Rome and the Middle Adriatic area, which shaped the development of the settlement from its earliest days.

A maritime village existed along the mouth of the Pescara River as early as the 1st century BC, known as Aternum or Ostia Aterni. In the centuries that followed, Pescara’s strategic location, serving as the gateway to the great valley that divides Abruzzo, consistently influenced its economic and social development. Initially, it functioned primarily as a military stronghold for the defense of southern kingdoms, but from the second half of the 19th century, it became known for its thriving commercial activity and seaside tourism.

Following the bombardments of 1943, which destroyed much of the urban center, the city rapidly rebuilt as a modern regional hub. Benefiting from its strategic position bridging northern and southern Italy, Pescara experienced significant economic, industrial, and touristic growth, forming a large metropolitan area. Within a few years, it became the central hub of the Abruzzo region and the middle Adriatic area.

== Prehistory and protohistory ==
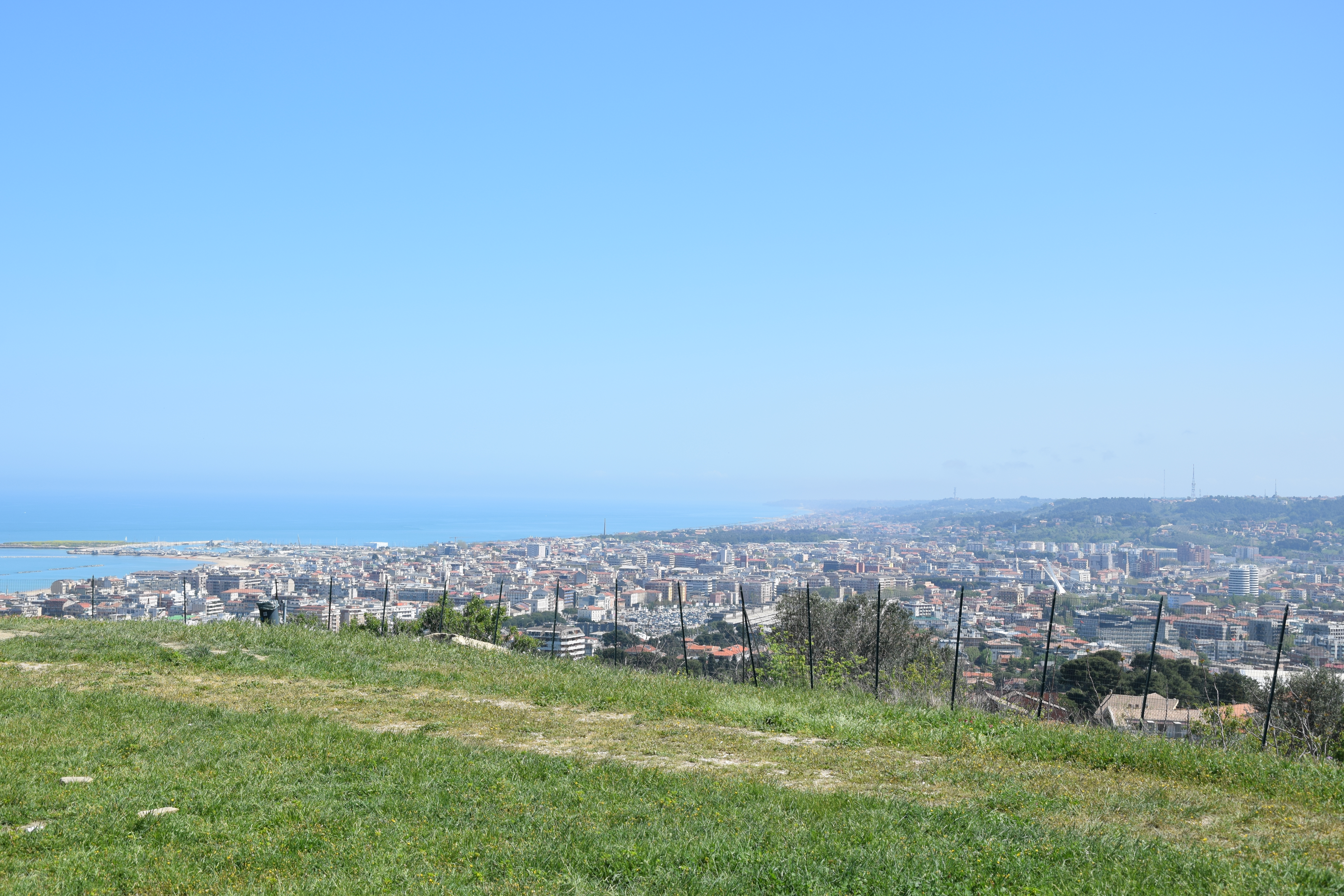
The city as seen from the Telegrafo hill plateau, site of one of the earliest settlements

=== Origins ===
It is believed that the first human settlement was established at the summit of Telegrafo Hill (named for an ancient communication system), approximately 140 meters high and located about one kilometer from the northern coast of the river, on a natural terrace overlooking the valleys of the Pescara and Saline rivers. After a month of excavations conducted in the summer of 2005, artifacts dating back to the 4th millennium BC were uncovered. The work, carried out on the hill’s plateau by the Superintendence for Archaeological Heritage of Abruzzo, confirmed that the findings relate to a settlement inhabited during the protohistory (the second prehistoric period spanning the Bronze Age and the Iron Age). The site also shows evidence of occupation during the Roman period and is documented in historical sources up to the year 1000.

Remains of a farmers’ village from the first half of the 5th millennium BC were found at Colle della Corona, in the hilly area south of the Pescara River near the Fontanelle district. Numerous necropolises have been discovered in various parts of the city’s hills, and their layouts and arrangements indicate a gradual descent of the population toward the natural landing point at the mouth of the Pescara River. These dynamics fully confirm the attribution of Ostia Aterni to the Vestini by Strabo.

== Ancient period ==
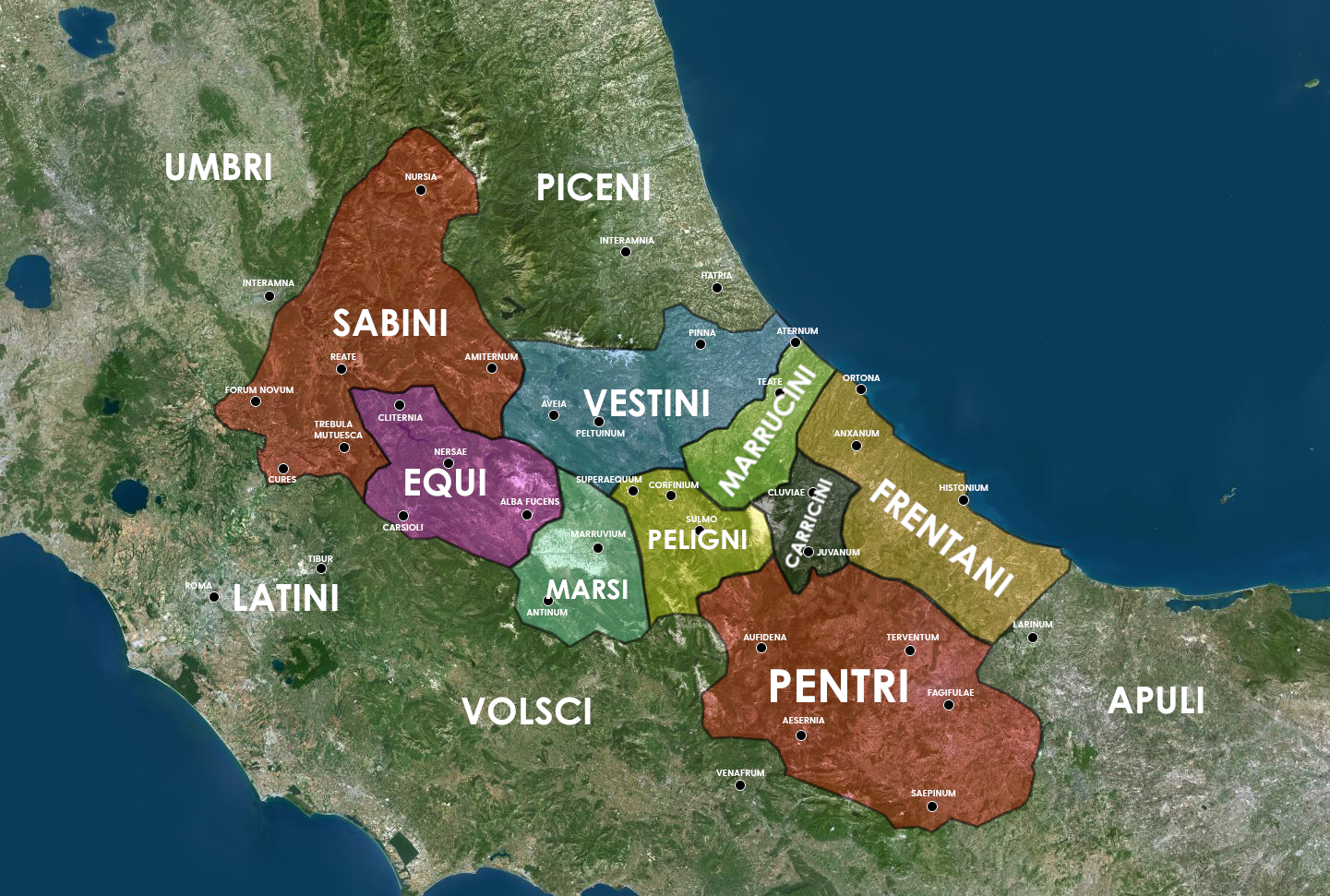
Italic peoples settled in Abruzzo and Molise

=== Italic period ===
The earliest inhabitants of the village on the riverbanks were identified in historical sources as being of Pelasgic origin. They crossed the Adriatic Sea from the Dalmatian coast and established an initial emporium. However, it was the Vestini, the first Italic people, who recognized the strategic importance of the settlement’s location. Evidence of port activities dating back to the 5th century BC has been found, linked to the settlement on Telegrafo Hill, which persisted into the medieval period. From the 1st century BC, the Vestini established a permanent presence in the area of Old Pescara. They developed an efficient port, also used by the Marrucini and Peligni. At the time of initial contact with the Romans, the village was called Vicus Aterni and later, taking the name of the river (then known as Aternus), Aternum. In the imperial period, Pescara was also referred to as Ostia Aterni, as noted in the Tabula Peutingeriana, due to its role as a key hub for communication routes. The name Ostia Aterni specifically denoted the landing at the river’s mouth, as both the city and the Val Pescara were, and remain, the main access route from Abruzzo’s coastal areas to the inland region and Rome.

=== Roman conquest ===
The Vestini, along with the Marsi, Marrucini, and Peligni, participated in a confederation that clashed with the Roman Republic during the Second Samnite War in 325 BC. In 304 BC, after the severe defeat of the Aequi by the Romans under the consuls Publius Sempronius Sophus and Publius Sulpicius Saverrio, the neighboring Italic peoples of the Vestini—the Marsi, Peligni, Marrucini, and Frentani—sent ambassadors to Rome to request an alliance, which was granted through a treaty. However, an agreement of foedus with the Vestini was only formalized two years later, in 302 BC, reflecting their particular hostility toward Rome. This hostility resurfaced during the Second Punic War: Aternum revolted against Roman control and was subsequently conquered and sacked by the praetor Publius Sempronius Tuditanus in 215 BC.

After more than two centuries of alliance with Rome, the town came under direct Roman control, along with all the territories of Abruzzo and Molise, in 88 BC following the Social War. At the start of the 1st century BC, the Vestini joined the broad coalition of Italic peoples that waged war to secure Roman citizenship, which had been repeatedly denied (91–88 BC). The Italic army, divided into two groups—one Sabellic led by the Marsian Quintus Poppaedius Silo, the other Samnite under Gaius Papius Mutilus—included contingents from numerous peoples, with the Vestini led by Gaius Pontidius.

Poppaedius Silo, leading the Marsi and Vestini, successfully ambushed and defeated the Roman Quintus Servilius Caepio in 90 BC. However, the Vestini were later defeated separately by Gnaeus Pompeius Strabo, as part of Rome’s broader victory over the rebellious socii, culminating in the capture of Ascoli by Pompeius.

=== The Roman city ===
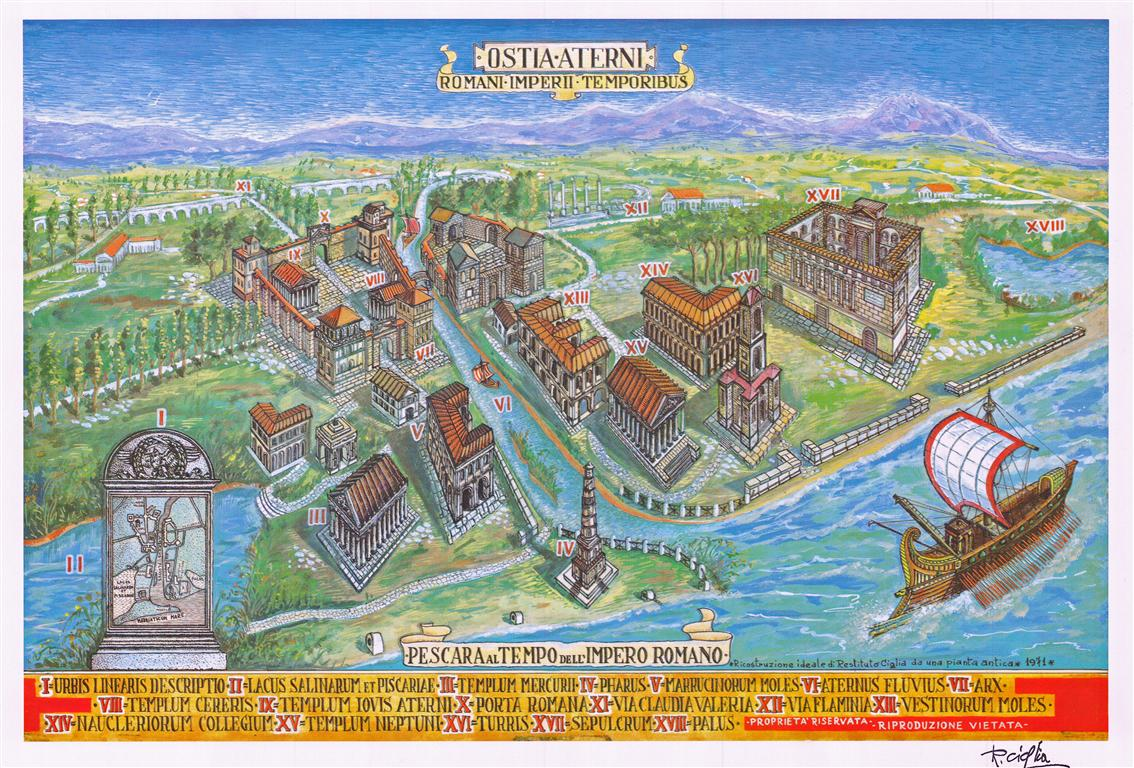
Artistic reconstruction of Ostia Aterni by Restituto Ciglia

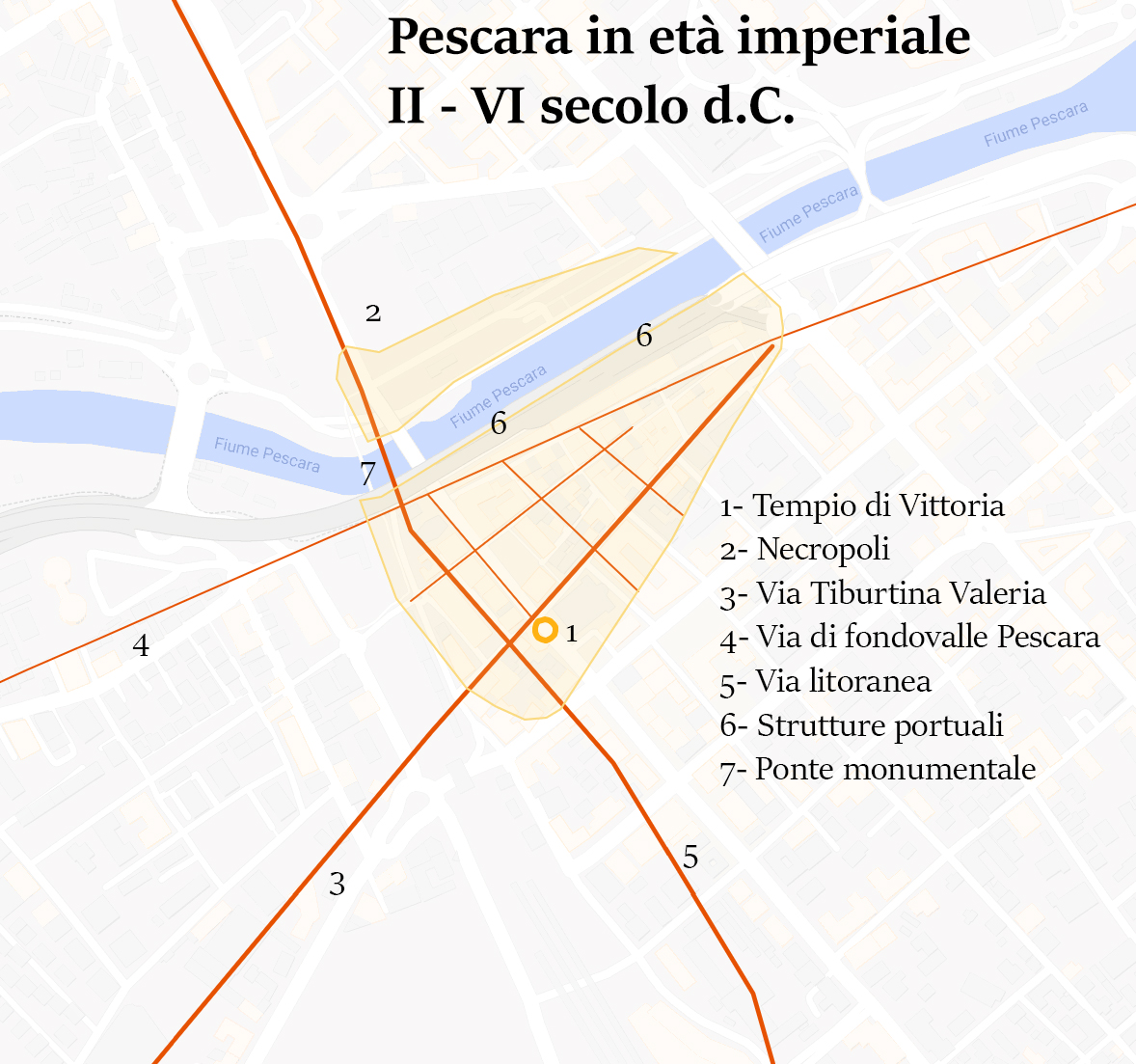
Reconstruction of the urban center in the imperial period

After the Social War, the Lex Iulia de civitate, which granted Roman citizenship to all Italic peoples who remained loyal to Rome, was gradually extended to the rebellious peoples, including the Vestini. Their territories were heavily colonized, especially during the time of Sulla, and from then on, the Romanization of the region, and consequently of Aternum, progressed rapidly, as evidenced by the swift disappearance of Italic languages from written sources, replaced by Latin. During the Augustan period, Ostia Aterni was part of the Regio IV Samnium, one of the Italian regions of the time, and the Vestini were included in the Quirina tribe. Under Roman rule, the small village developed into a proper town, reaching its peak development in the 2nd century. During this period, significant public and private buildings were constructed, supported by the moderate commercial activity of the port. Several temples were built, including one dedicated to Jupiter Aternius. The presence of an extensive necropolis has been confirmed in the area of Rampigna field, used through late antiquity. Archaeological evidence, specifically the discovery in the 18th century of fragments of an inscription on a wall in the Rampigna area and in a courtyard of Villa De Riseis, preserved in the provincial library of Chieti, attests to the presence of the cult of the goddess Isis in the city. Other fragments of a bas-relief depicting the Egyptian goddess were found near the canal port on the northern bank. Dating to the early imperial period is the construction of a bridge over the river, located between the old railway bridge and the D’Annunzio bridge, which underwent significant restoration in the 2nd century. The construction of the new route of the Via Claudia Valeria in 48/49 AD gave the settlement a distinctive elongated triangular shape, with one vertex at Piazza Unione and the two longer sides formed by the older valley road and the new consular road. Later, a religious building, which in the medieval period would be dedicated to Saint Jerusalem, was constructed. Built in the early decades of the 4th century, this centrally planned structure is presumed to have been a temple or altar dedicated to the deity Victoria, particularly revered during the imperial and Tetrarchic periods, due to an inscription on the rear wall, lost in the 19th century, which clearly read: "(vic)TORIAE AUGUSTAE SACRUM". Its eight-niche design made it nearly identical in size, typology, and construction techniques to the contemporary Mausoleum of Helena in Rome. This new construction was part of a broader renewal of the city’s infrastructure, including the bridge and port, both to address the poor maintenance during the Crisis of the Third Century and to reflect the growing importance of the settlement at the start of the 4th century, when Emperor Diocletian chose to build his palace in Salona, in the area that would later become the city of Split. The Antonine Itinerary mentions a route between Aternum and Salona of 1550 stades.

Despite its relative importance, Aternum never achieved the status of a municipium. No archaeological remains typical of major Roman centers, such as amphitheaters, thermae, or theaters, have been found.

== Barbarian invasions ==
With the Fall of the Western Roman Empire in 476 and the rise of the Ostrogothic Kingdom in Italy, the history of Aternum becomes obscure. It was heavily impacted by the Barbarian invasions, the bloody Gothic War, and finally the Lombard invasion. In 538, the city, garrisoned by the Ostrogoths under a certain Tremone, was conquered by the magister militum John on the orders of the strategos autokrator Belisarius, who, after fierce fighting, occupied the oppidum. This occurred shortly after the first siege of Rome during Emperor Justinian I’s attempt at imperial restoration. The Byzantines, stationed in Crecchio and Ortona, strengthened Abruzzo’s port defenses and infrastructure, including those of Aternum, which was encircled by walls 3.03 meters thick, or 10 Roman feet, surrounding the remaining settlement between Via Conte di Ruvo, Piazza Unione, the southern floodplain, and Via Orazio. Likely from this period is the construction of the "Castellum ad mare," whose remains were found on Telegrafo Hill, a site inhabited since 3000 BC. This castle played a significant role, both in protecting the village there and as a lookout and defense point for the underlying port of Aternum. However, Byzantine rule in Italy proved short-lived, with the Lombard invasion beginning in 568.

The Lombards arrived in Abruzzo between 580 and 591. Aternum, Ortona, and Histonium were among the centers that resisted the invaders the longest. The Byzantines had established an elaborate defense system, with coastal garrisons at river mouths or natural inlets. They also occupied ancient rural villas (villae) and stationes (villages that emerged near horse-changing stations, which became commercial hubs), turning them into fortified camps. This system included key urban centers such as Kastron Terentinon (Castrum Truentinum) at the mouth of the Tronto, Kastron Nobon (Castrum Novum) in the Tordino Valley, Aternum in the Val Pescara, Anxanum, Kastron Beneren (Vicus Veneris) in the Sangro Valley, and Kastron Reunia in the Trigno valley near the southern outskirts of Histonium. These fortified settlements aimed to protect both the main river mouths and their respective valleys, focusing particularly on defending the Via Tiburtina Valeria, the coastal road, and the Municia (coinciding with the state road 17 in the stretch from Corfinio to Bojano). Consequently, with only a limited army in southern Italy, the Lombards adapted to a positional war. To avoid Byzantine enclaves and fortified coastal garrisons, they chose a foothill penetration route, settling not only in cities but also in surviving castra, vici, pagi, and rural villas from the destructive wars with the Ostrogoths. The Lombards often reoccupied abandoned settlements, repurposing Roman ruins to meet their needs. Initially, the Byzantines halted the Lombards along the natural boundary of the Tronto River, relying on the fortified camp of Castrum Truentinum and other inland fortified centers such as Castrum Aprutentium (modern Teramo, once a municipium known as Interamnia Praetuttiorum, but by then reduced to a simple castrum). Other fortified sites included Campli and Ancarano. The Lombards confronted the enemy, establishing themselves in Castel Trosino, Sant'Egidio alla Vibrata, Civitella del Tronto, Leofara, and Valle Castellana. Their occupation attempts came simultaneously from the north, led by Faroald I from the Duchy of Spoleto, and from the south, under Zotto from the Duchy of Benevento, forcing the Byzantines to establish a defensive line in the Marsica region, near the Fucine Lake.

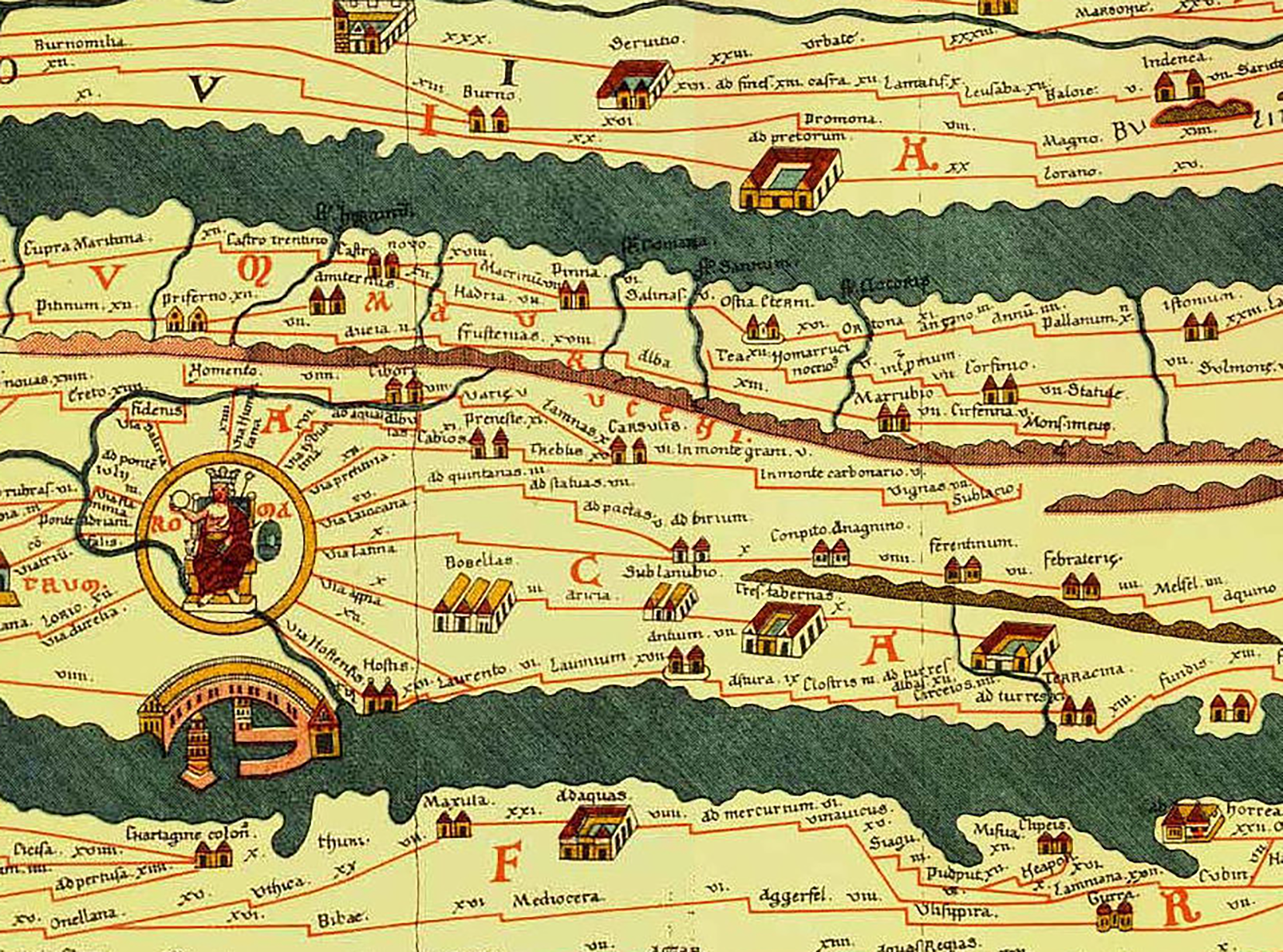
Ostia Aterni in the Tabula Peutingeriana

The Byzantine defensive system began to collapse as early as 580 with the fall of Castrum Truentinum, followed shortly by Castrum Novum. Forced to retreat, the Byzantines established another defensive line at Pinna, Lauretum (recently founded in the modern Colle Fiorano fraction of Loreto Aprutino), Cappelle sul Tavo, Angulum, and Statio ad Salinas (located in the Villa Carmine district of Montesilvano). The southern defensive stronghold was Castrum Kephalia (modern Cepagatti, where a large rural villa was fortified). To the south, the Byzantines maintained their garrisons in Marsica, Ortona, and Crecchio until 595.

With the fall of Venafrum and the inland areas of Molise in 595, the Lombards gained the upper hand along the Via Tiburtina Valeria, spreading into the Abruzzo plateaus. Soon the inland regions of Marsica and L'Aquila fell, with cities such as Amiternum, Aufinum, Aveia, Alba Fucens, Peltuinum, Marruvium, Carsioli, and Castrum Caelene devastated by the brute violence of the Lombards’ conquest methods. Meanwhile, the Lombards from the Duchy of Spoleto consolidated their conquests north of Aternum in Hadria, Angulum, and Lauretum. The Lombard conquest was completed through gradual penetration, first in the Teramo area by the Germanics of the Duchy of Spoleto, and later in the L’Aquila and Chieti areas. The Lombards from Benevento bypassed the Byzantine defenses in the Peligna Basin along the Tiburtina, advancing through Pacentro via Guado San Leonardo, conquering Caramanico Terme, Roccamorice, Bolognano, Musellaro di Bolognano, San Valentino in Abruzzo Citeriore, and the entire Orta valley. They eventually rejoined the Lombards from Spoleto, coming from the Via Claudia Nova, at Pagus Fabianus in the Val Pescara. The barbarians also established themselves in the inland Chieti area and the eastern Maiella valley, where many toponyms still reflect their presence. Traces of Lombard settlement have also been identified in Caramanico, Bolognano, Musellaro, Roccamorice, San Valentino, Manoppello, Serramonacesca, Tocco da Casauria, Scafa, Pescosansonesco, Rosciano (Piano della Fara), Civitaquana (Colle Scurcola), Alanno (Colle della Sala), and Spoltore. The Lombard armies thus positioned themselves on the eastern slope of the Maiella, facing the Byzantines in Anxanum, Crecchio, Canosa Sannita, Vacri, Bucchianico, and Teate. On the northern slope of the mountain, the invaders consolidated their positions on both banks of the Pescara River. However, the occupation process was slow, spanning decades, and the Trabocchi Coast, including Aternum, remained under Byzantine control for some time. In the conquered centers, a gradual transformation of the ancient urban structure began, such as the abandonment and ruin of surviving city infrastructure and the insertion of burials in abandoned urban areas, both in inland regions such as Amiternum and Marruvium and in Adriatic Abruzzo, such as Castrum Truentinum, Castrum Novum, Pinna, Interamnia, and Teate.

The Byzantines retained coastal garrisons at Aternum, Ortona, Vicus Veneris, and Histonium, which resisted until the mid-7th century, generally maintaining a structure somewhat reminiscent of the ancient one, despite significant restructuring. Aternum finally fell in the last years of the 6th century. However, the settlement remained contested between the Byzantines of the Exarchate of Ravenna and the Lombards until the mid-7th century. The occupation of the Trabocchi Coast was definitively completed only after the failed military campaign of Emperor Constans II in 663. After landing in Italy and capturing Barium, Constans II attacked the Duchy of Benevento, which was momentarily undefended as Duke Grimoald, who had become King of the Lombards, had gone to Ticinum with his army to take possession of the kingdom and defend it from a simultaneous Frankish invasion from the north, leaving his son Romuald as duke. Grimoald, after repelling the Franks, returned from the north with his army of about thirty thousand men, defeating the Byzantines and preventing Constans II from conquering the entire duchy. This allowed the Lombard king, upon his victorious return, to capture the various Byzantine enclaves along the Trabocchi Coast with little resistance. The Lombards then systematically reoccupied the strongholds of Byzantine presence in the territory and divided the Abruzzo region into seven gastaldates: Marsica, Valva, Amiternum, Forcona, Aprutium, Pinna, and Histonium.

The barbarian rule was harsh, driven by a spirit of domination and plunder, as evidenced by archaeological traces of a large fire in the city following its fall. This is also recounted in the Passion (the legend of the martyrdom) of Cetteus: Aternum was entrusted to two Lombard soldiers, Alais (or Alagiso) and Umblo (or Umblone), who oppressed it with abuses and murders. They are attributed with the murder of Cetteus, the patron saint of Pescara and bishop of the town at the time. Accused by the Arian Lombards of being complicit in a Nicene Byzantine plot to recapture Aternum, he was thrown from the marble bridge with a stone tied around his neck on 13 June 597. There is scant information about the following centuries, during which the settlement, significantly depopulated and with all urban infrastructure in ruins, experienced a period of great decline, as did most cities in the region. This is suggested by archaeological evidence showing a return to huts and houses made of wood and raw clay, and the abandonment of large portions of the urban center.

== Medieval history ==
Italy in the year 1000

=== The new name ===
Transferred from the Duchy of Benevento to the Duchy of Spoleto in 801 following the Carolingian invasions of the Chieti territory, around the year 1000, the river Aternum was called Piscarius, and the riverside borough re-emerged from obscurity with the first evidence of new masonry constructions. As in the past, the town adopted the river’s name, becoming Piscaria. This toponym, likely of ancient origin, was among the holdings of the Abbey of Montecassino. The name designated a site particularly suited for fishing, rich in fish, a fish market, or a place for collecting fishing rights. According to another theory, the name of the Pescara River, whose springs originate within four caves of the Gran Sasso massif at the Popoli Gorges, and which gives the settlement its name, may derive from the ancient Osco-Umbrian term pesco, found in many regional toponyms (Pescocostanzo, Pescosansonesco, Pescasseroli), meaning rock or height. Regardless, the name Piscaria is attested in late antiquity, as noted by Paul the Deacon, referring to the lower course of the Aterno River. The name Piscaria, likely already popular locally, gradually gained traction until, by the 13th century, the name Aternum appeared only in chancery documents before disappearing entirely. Another settlement, cited among the possessions of the Abbey of Montecassino, was the Curtis de Gozzano, located in the flat area of the Zanni district and related to the settlement on Telegrafo Hill.

=== The first historical records of Piscaria ===
Despite being destroyed and rebuilt multiple times, the settlement always held significant importance due to its strategic position and robust Byzantine military defenses from the Gothic War. In 1059, the pieve of Saints Leontius and Domitian, along with a portion of the city of Aterno and its port, were possessions of the Diocese of Chieti. A papal bull from Pope Nicholas II to the new Chieti bishop, Atto, confirmed the diocese’s right to a portion of the port’s revenues, a right granted in 1045 by the Norman count Robert I of Loritello. In 1090, the Norman count Drogo (also called Tasso, Tassio, Tassone, or Tascione), brother of Robert I, resided in the city and died there on 18 August. Together with Robert, he had begun the Norman conquest of Adriatic Abruzzo after 1060. This suggests that the city was a seat of the county alongside Loreto Aprutino. By the end of the century, the Normans expanded from the Adriatic area of Apulia northward, conquering vast Abruzzo territories then part of the March of Fermo, a subdivision of the Duchy of Spoleto (by then under papal influence). In 1081, Pope Gregory VII and the Norman leader Robert Guiscard established the new border between the March of Fermo and the newly formed Duchy of Apulia and Calabria along the Tronto River through the Agreement of Ceprano. However, it took the Normans another sixty years to complete the conquest of the region from the Lombards. Although Abruzzo had been conquered by the Carolingian Franks in 774 and incorporated into the March of Fermo around the year 1000, it was not colonized by them, retaining much of its Lombard hierarchical and social structure, which simply submitted to the new territorial rulers. This border endured for nearly a millennium, still separating the Marche region from Abruzzo. In 1095, Robert I of Loritello, now comes comitorum (count of counts) of the Normans, granted the Chieti bishop Rainolfo several possessions he had previously taken, and in the document, Piscaria is described as having many churches. These included the church of San Salvatore, the aforementioned pieve of Saints Leontius and Domitian (located at the foot of the city near the gate facing the sea, in the area corresponding to Piazza Unione), and other churches such as San Tommaso Apostolo (on which the pieve depended), San Nicola, and Santa Gerusalemme, whose foundations were uncovered between 1990 and 1992 in front of the Cathedral of San Cetteo.

=== The Norman conquest ===
In 1140, after decades of penetration and consolidation of the Norman presence in the region, Pescara, along with the rest of Abruzzo, was definitively conquered by the Norman king Roger II of Sicily, becoming part of the nascent Kingdom of Sicily, whose fortunes it followed for the next seven hundred years. Roger himself ordered several works in the city, including the reconstruction of the Byzantine walls, which in many places had been converted into dwellings, and the restoration and enhancement of the port. To commemorate these works, a now-lost inscription, still legible in the 16th century, was placed, reading: “ROGERIUS DEI GRATIA REX FECIT”. As evidence of the quality of these works, a Byzantine fleet stopped at Aternum in 1155, carrying emissaries of Emperor Manuel I Komnenos seeking an alliance with the count Robert III of Loritello, who was in open rebellion against King William I of Sicily. The following years were marked by the progressive deepening of the settlement’s crisis and multiple devastations caused by frequent river floods, which raised the water table, causing widespread swamping, malaria outbreaks, and the permanent silting of ancient port structures, shifting the river’s mouth about ten meters north from its ancient position. The city also suffered attacks from local lords or major powers of the time, such as in 1209 during the campaign in Italy by Emperor Otto IV of Brunswick, who conquered and burned the city in his attempt to subdue the Kingdom of Sicily to the Holy Roman Empire. These were difficult years characterized by ruin, destruction, and raids, with the city’s fortunes dictated by the continuous succession of new territorial lords. Meanwhile, in 1273, King Charles I of Anjou, through the Diploma of Alife, divided the Justiciarate of Abruzzo, deemed too vast to govern effectively, into two regions: Aprutium citra flumen Piscariae and Aprutium ultra flumen Piscariae, with Piscaria falling into the former. Many Swabian cities, such as the former capital Sulmona, lost their central role in the kingdom to smaller towns or ancient capitals that had fallen into decline, such as L'Aquila and Chieti, which remained the only significant political, financial, economic, and cultural centers during this period. From the second half of the 13th century, and increasingly during the Crisis of the 14th century, the city experienced progressive depopulation, evidenced by the abandonment and ruin of most religious centers. The city’s difficult situation is also evidenced by the total tax exemption granted by Queen Joanna I of Naples in 1342, 1349 (during the peak of the Black Death), and again in 1384 by her successor Charles III of Naples, among other reasons, “PROPTER AERIS EPITHIMIAM” (due to the malarial air). Among the numerous lords who ruled Pescara during this period were Rainaldo Orsini, Luigi di Savoia, and Francesco del Borgo, known as Cecco del Cozzo, vicar of Ladislaus I of Naples, who in 1409 rebuilt the castle and tower of Roman origin guarding the bridge, remembered as a wise and virtuous man. Francesco del Borgo became the first Marquis of Pescara, the first in the kingdom to assume the title of marquis in 1403.

== Modern history ==
Coat of arms of the Marquisate of Pescara

=== The D’Avalos-D’Aquino ===
The 15th century was characterized by the dominance of the D’Avalos-D’Aquino family, who held the Marquisate of Pescara until the abolition of feudalism, albeit with several interruptions.

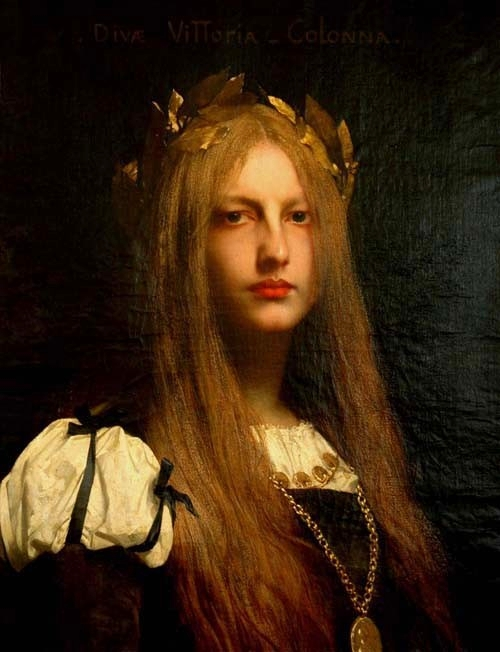
Vittoria Colonna, Marchioness of Pescara, in a painting by Jules Lefèvre

On 4 January 1424, the condottiero Giacomo Attendolo died in the city while attempting to cross the Pescara River. He was leading his army, assembled in Ortona, to aid the city of L’Aquila, besieged by the Aragonese under Braccio da Montone. Unable to pass through Pescara, also occupied by Aragonese troops, he attempted to cross the river between the city and the sea but perished due to the force of the winds and waves. In 1435 and 1439, the city, again aligned with the Aragonese, was conquered by the Neapolitan condottiero Giacomo Caldora, serving the Angevins, who conducted raids and sacks throughout the region during the succession war between Alfonso V of Aragon and René of Anjou, triggered by the death without heirs of Queen Joanna II of Naples, initiating the Aragonese dynasty in Naples. Alfonso V reconquered Pescara in 1442 at the war’s end, establishing the universitas (communal entity of the Kingdom of Naples) of Pescara in 1443. It later faced attacks and raids by the Venetians, who, after destroying the ancient port of Atri, assaulted Pescara first in 1447 and again in 1482, when eight hundred stradioti of the light cavalry captured the castle during the events of the War of Ferrara.

In 1453, after being a fief exclusively of the D’Aquino family for many years, Pescara was enfeoffed to Íñigo Dávalos through his marriage to Antonella d’Aquino. As the Pescara territory lacked the allodial rights necessary for minting coins, the couple minted gold, silver, and copper coins in Rocca San Giovanni, holding the title of Marquises of Pescara. The growing importance of the Port of Pescara at the expense of the traditional port of San Vito Chietino, the traditional port of call for the Lanciano fair, redirected the court’s interests to Pescara, enabling the Lercaro and Spinola families to extract oil from the Pescara port. In 1503, following the events of the Italian War of 1499–1504, the Spanish conquered the Kingdom of Naples, appointing viceroys of their trust and occupying all key positions. In 1509, Vittoria Colonna became Marchioness of Pescara by marrying Fernando d'Ávalos, who in 1525, leading fifteen hundred Italo-Spanish arquebusiers, was a key figure in the victorious Battle of Pavia against the French led by King Francis I of France, who was captured in the conflict.

In 1528, during the War of the League of Cognac, Pescara was captured by Odet de Foix, Viscount of Lautrec and Marshal of France, during his advance toward Naples ordered by Francis I. Italian states, fearing excessive Habsburg dominance after the catastrophic French defeat at Pavia, aligned with Francis I, who, after regaining freedom from captivity in Madrid, declared the peace treaty with Charles V null. In 1526, Pope Clement VII of the Medici family, also alarmed by Charles V’s rising power, promoted the League of Cognac, alongside Francis I, the Republic of Venice, the Republic of Florence, and other minor Italian states. Due to the pope’s involvement, it was also called the “Second Holy League.”

The league was formalized on 22 May 1526 and was joined the following year by Henry VIII of England, who committed to neutrality.

The Doge of Venice and the Pope were the most interested parties in this coalition, and they often urged the King of France to send military reinforcements. After capturing Pescara, Odet de Foix besieged Naples in the summer of 1528 but died there due to a plague epidemic he himself had caused.

As the conflict prolonged, the shared financial difficulties of the contenders and the threatening advance of the Ottomans, who had reached Hungary and were poised to attack Habsburg territories in central Europe, forced Charles V, King of Spain and Emperor of the Holy Roman Empire, to sign the Peace of Cambrai. Although less disadvantageous for the French than the previous treaty, it ended their claims to Italian territories. The D’Avalos family regained the Marquisate of Pescara, while Spain definitively reaffirmed its dominion over Italy, with Charles V becoming the sole arbiter of its fortunes.

=== Spanish domination and the fortress ===
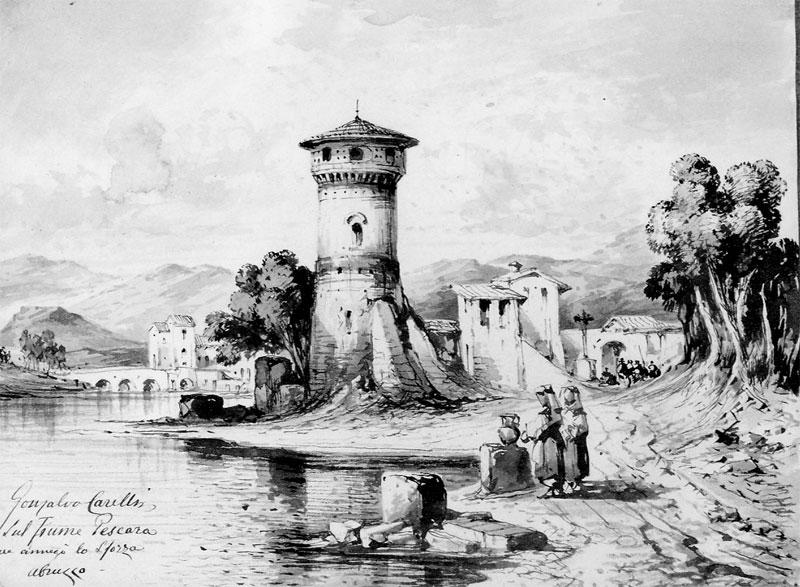
Reconstruction of Pescara in 1424 by Consalvo Carelli

A document from 1530, preserved in the General Archive of Simancas, describes Pescara as a semi-abandoned village, indicating the collapse of the medieval settlement, with only structures directly related to the port’s commercial activities remaining active.:

…this land is so ruined and devastated that only four large inns with stables or taverns and some warehouses remain; there is significant transit, as goods arrive by sea and river on boats from Venice, Schiavonia, and other places, unloading many commodities and loading grain, oil, and many other products in return; it has an excellent port with small boats entering safely into the river; this has a wooden bridge, at the end of which is a fortress tower with a regular guard. Part of this bridge is a drawbridge, and those at the tower allow no one to pass, by water or land, without paying duties…

The settlement also had a sheep custom house in the Rampigna area, evidence of the passage through the town of the Frisa-Rocca di Roseto sheep track, located near the wooden bridge built on the foundations of Aternum’s Roman bridge. Its columns were depicted in city maps until their collapse in the 18th century.

During this period, the Chieti nobility offered twelve thousand ducats to Charles V to reclaim the fief, but he rejected the offer, reinstating the D’Avalos of Vasto in Pescara. Thanks to a certain stabilization of political power in the Kingdom of Naples, a new flourishing period in the city’s history began, largely due to its strategic position. By order of Charles V between 1510 and 1557, in various phases, a fortress was built across both banks of the Pescara River, designed by Gian Tommaso Scala, in the shape of an irregular pentagon with seven bastions at the vertices. It was garrisoned by a reduced force to serve as a fortified troop concentration point in case of war. Pedro de Toledo, viceroy of Naples for Philip II of Spain, further advanced Charles V’s plan, prompted by growing hostilities with Pope Paul IV. He focused on enhancing the kingdom’s and the town’s maritime and terrestrial defenses through the construction of the coastal tower defense system, including the Fortress of Pescara.

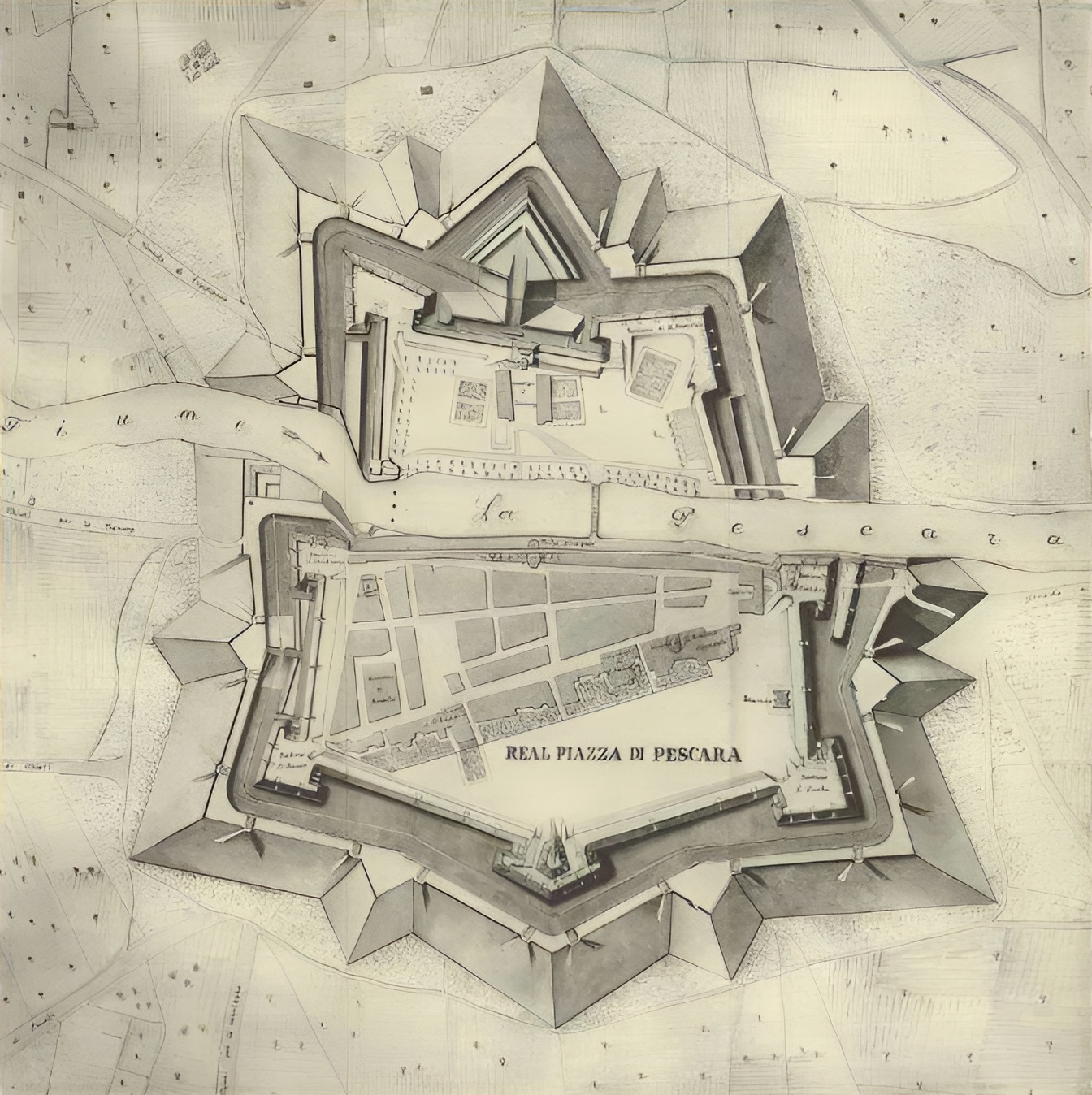
The Pescara fortress at the beginning of the 19th century

In a 1560 document by Pedro Afán de Ribera, Duke of Alcalà, Pescara is cited as having two hundred households (about one thousand inhabitants), mostly foreigners, with fifty families owning houses and vineyards. Most men were employed as laborers or in the fortress’s construction. In a 1566 report by Ferrante Loffredo, Marquis of Trevico, the fortress was described as nearly completed. Maps from the period, still showing the circular Santa Gerusalemme building, attest to its survival, with the last historical records dating back to the 12th century.

This imposing structure, housing between one hundred and seven hundred soldiers depending on the situation, has only the Bourbon barracks with its attached prison remaining. Known as the "bagno" because many cells were flooded during frequent inundations, often causing the death of inmates, it now houses the Museum of the People of Abruzzo. A mid-century accounting ledger belonging to the portulano (port overseer, responsible for managing trade traffic, duties, road maintenance, construction, and water distribution in southern Italy) of Pescara, named Bonfiglio, also survives, documenting goods within the fortress.

=== The Ottoman assault ===
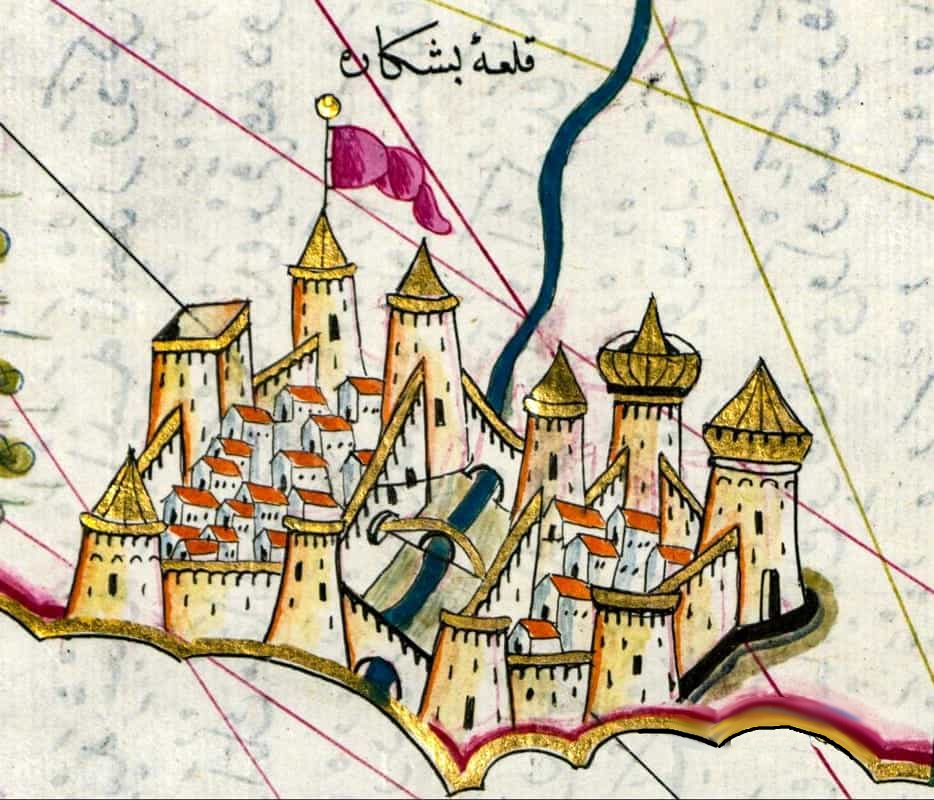
The fortress in a 1525 map by Piri Reis

Due to the Franco-Ottoman alliance of 1536, which also brought Muslim corsairs to Italian coasts, the fortress was attacked in 1566 by the Ottoman fleet of 105 galleys and 7,000 men under Admiral Piyale Pasha, Kapudan Pasha of the fleet under Suleiman the Magnificent. The fortress was not taken, thanks in part to the decisive contribution of the condottiero Giovan Girolamo Acquaviva, Duke of Atri, who organized the fortress’s defense and repelled the attacks with a barrage of fire from the main bastion using all available artillery, deterring the admiral from continuing the assault and forcing the attackers to flee. According to some historians, there was no true siege, but rather a minor skirmish with Ottoman fleet scouts, who, noting the strength of the city’s defenses, retreated, dissuading the admiral from proceeding. Regardless, the Ottomans then attacked Francavilla al Mare, Ripa Teatina, Ortona, San Vito Chietino, Vasto, Casalbordino, Serracapriola, Guglionesi, and Termoli, causing destruction, deportations, and looting. However, the Ottoman admiral failed to achieve the expedition’s strategic goal, the conquest of the Tremiti Islands and the Sanctuary of Santa Maria a Mare, partly due to Pescara’s tenacious resistance. In this regard, Giovanni Andrea Tria, citing Tommaso Costo’s History of the Kingdom of Naples, writes:

It was already August of this year 66 when the Turkish fleet, led by Piali Pasha, reached the Gulf of Venice; and when it was opposite Pescara, a famous and strong place in Abruzzo, it stopped. Then, resuming rowing, it attacked that coast, where, due to the negligence of the province’s governor, little preparation had been made, and it plundered and burned some towns, namely Francavilla, Ortona, Ripa di Chieti, S. Vito, Vasto, Serra Capriola, Guglionesi, and Termoli, taking away as much loot and people as could be loaded onto the galleys, destroying and ruining everything else…

— Giovanni Andrea Tria, Historical Memoirs

The protection offered by the imposing walls, which continued to be built and improved throughout the 17th century, allowed many to live and trade. Later, the city gained the right to host a free fair, to the detriment of the declining Lanciano fair, attracting merchants and their benefits. This led to a repopulation of the right bank of the river and the development of the left bank, already known as Castellammare, where the D’Avalos cultivated new lands and established working relationships with numerous new settlers. However, the city, along with many Abruzzo centers, was struck by the Plague of 1656, which, though milder in Abruzzo than in other regions of the kingdom (thanks to effective prevention and control measures in places such as Sulmona and Città Sant'Angelo, which prevented the epidemic), caused deaths and devastation in all cities along communication routes between Campania and the kingdom’s northern borders, with Neapolitan fugitives spreading the epidemic across the southern kingdom, resulting in a 30% mortality rate in the region. During those years, the original small chapel of the Madonna of Seven Sorrows was built on the Castellammare hills, with the first recorded baptism on 26 November 1665. The chapel was officially consecrated and expanded to its current form in 1757.

=== Austrian period and Bourbon conquest ===
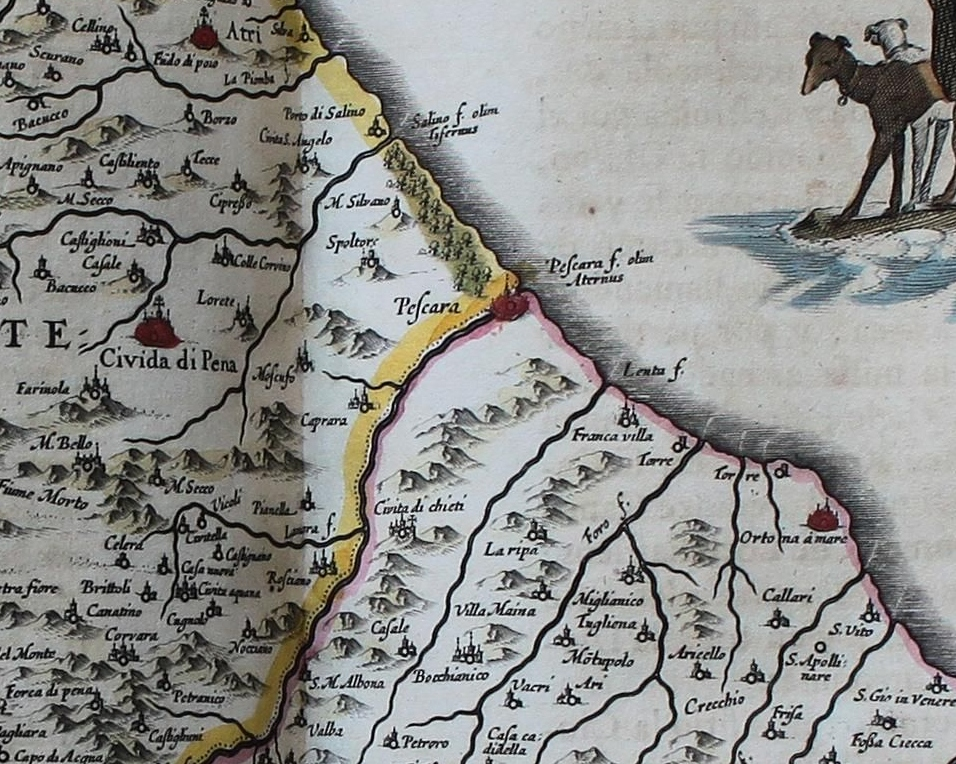
The Pescara area in a 1659 map, highlighting the borders between the two Abruzzos

At the beginning of the 18th century, the town had about three thousand inhabitants. The universitas of Pescara included Villa del Fuoco, Villa Fontanelle, Villa Castellammare (then consisting of only a few small scattered settlements among the city hills), Villa San Silvestro, and other areas corresponding to the future municipality’s territory. The entity was governed by a camerlengo, and this administrative structure persisted throughout the 18th century.

The battles for control of the royal fortress continued. Following the death without heirs of King Charles II of Spain in 1700, the War of the Spanish Succession broke out over control of the great empire between Philip V of Spain and Leopold I, Holy Roman Emperor. The city was attacked and occupied by the Austrians led by Count Wallis in 1707. Defending it was another Acquaviva, Giovan Girolamo II Acquaviva d’Aragona, Duke of Atri, who resisted heroically for two months before capitulating. As stipulated in the Treaty of Utrecht, the Kingdom of Naples, including the Pescara citadel, passed to the Austrians. However, in 1734, the fortress was besieged again by the Spanish under Charles III of Bourbon-Spain during the Bourbon conquest of the Two Sicilies, and after a bloody battle, it fell to the troops commanded by Francesco Eboli, Duke of Castropignano. The Bourbon kingdom gained effective autonomy from Spain in the Treaty of Vienna (1738), which concluded the War of the Polish Succession. In 1751, restoration work began on the dilapidated Santa Gerusalemme building, but it was soon halted and resumed in 1789 without significant recovery.

== Contemporary history ==
=== The Napoleonic wars ===
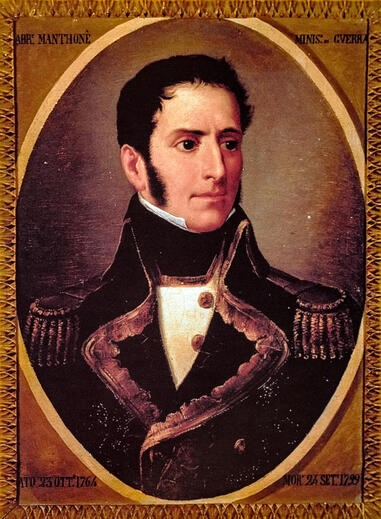
Gabriele Manthoné

With the advent of the French First Republic and the subsequent War of the First Coalition, the Pescara fortress was conquered in December 1798 at the end of Napoleon Bonaparte’s Italian Campaign, without bloodshed, by General Duhesme. This marked the beginning of the brief Neapolitan Republic of 1799. Upon arriving in Pescara, the general organized his legion, appointing Ettore Carafa, Count of Ruvo, as its leader, a key figure in the Neapolitan Republic alongside the Pescara native Gabriele Manthoné, who, as a minister in the Neapolitan republican government, organized resistance against the Bourbon reaction that same year.

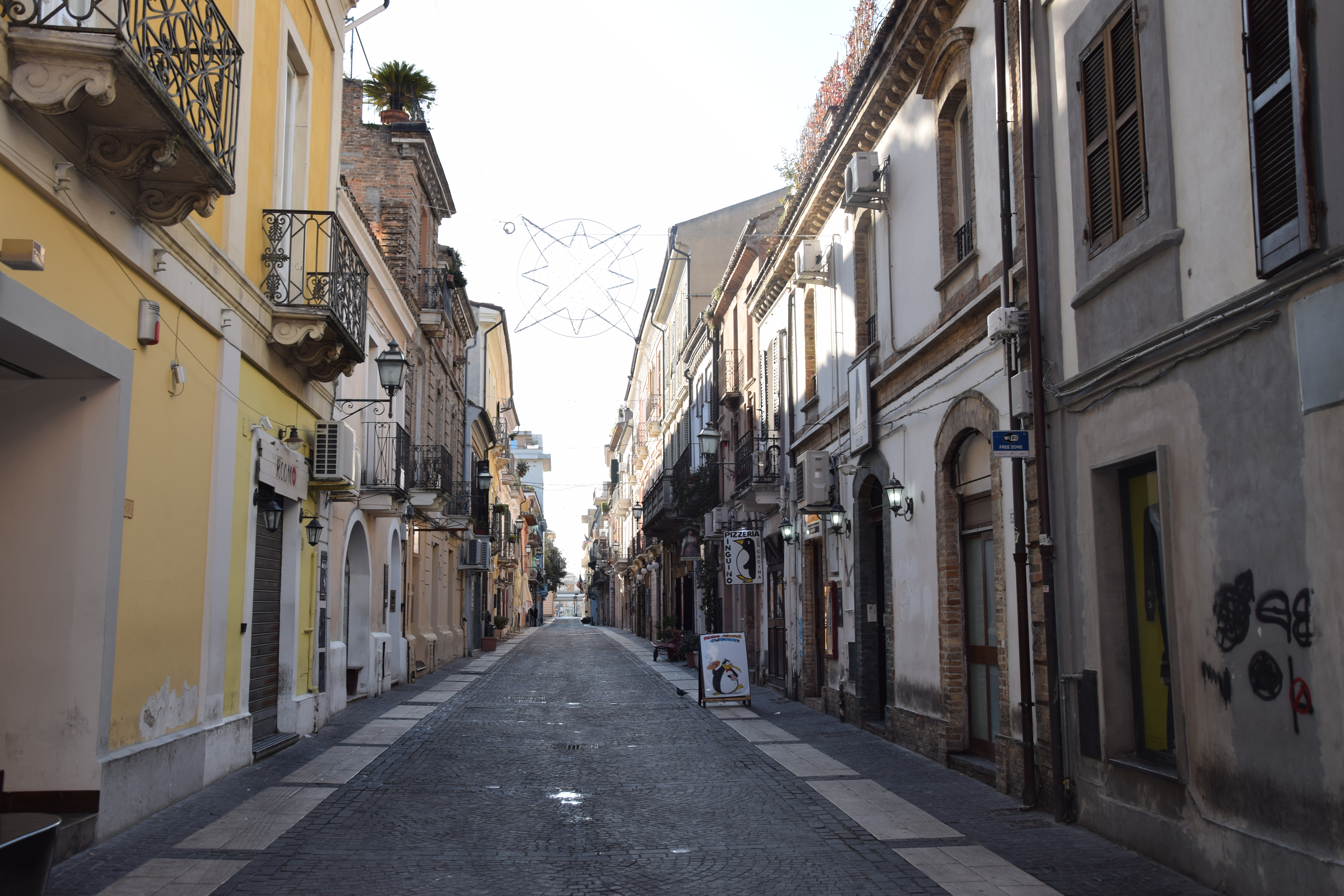
Corso Manthoné, the main street of the historic center

The revolution, due to limited popular participation, did not achieve the desired outcomes, and the republicans were soon overwhelmed by the reactionary forces of Cardinal Fabrizio Ruffo. The final siege of the Pescara fortress, defended by Carafa and the last republican stronghold in Abruzzo, was successfully conducted by anti-Jacobin Bourbon loyalists led by the Abruzzese general Giuseppe Pronio on 30 June 1799, under Ruffo’s command. When the fortress capitulated, the surrender terms were not honored, and before his arrest, Carafa managed to detonate the powder magazine, causing damage and fires in the city. Both Carafa and Manthoné were taken to Naples and executed in Piazza del Mercato, the former on 4 September, beheaded as a noble, and the latter on 24 September 1799 by hanging.

In the early 19th century, during the War of the Second Coalition, Pescara was once again occupied by the French during the second Italian Campaign, who held it until the Bourbon restoration established by the Congress of Vienna in 1815. It served as a significant military stronghold for the kingdom of Joseph Bonaparte.

=== Division of the city ===
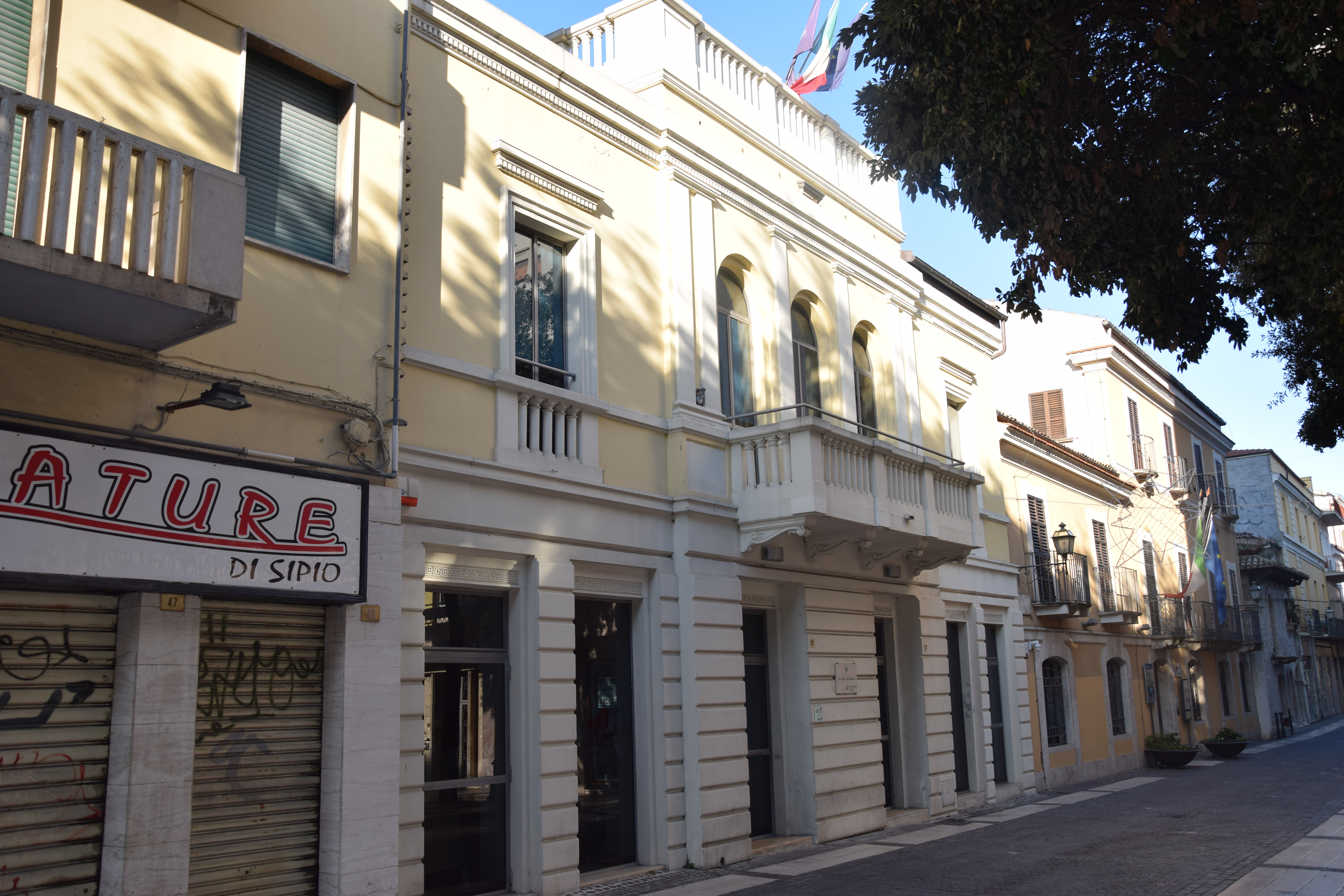
Modern reconstruction of the Circolo Aternino building, the former seat of the Pescara municipality, destroyed in 1943

In 1807, Villa Castellammare, located on the northern bank of the river (then with approximately 1,500 inhabitants), became an autonomous municipality within the district of Penne in Abruzzo Ulteriore, separating from the Pescara fortress, which remained in the district of Chieti in Abruzzo Citeriore. The separation resulted from the administrative reform of the kingdom initiated by Joseph Bonaparte. Following Law 132 of 8 August 1806 "on the division and administration of the provinces of the Kingdom", the subsequent Law 211 of 18 October 1806 abolished the universitates, replacing them with municipalities, establishing decurionates and provincial and district councils, and replacing the role of the chamberlain with that of the mayor. The division immediately caused issues, creating a historical rift between the towns on the two riverbanks, particularly because the new municipality of Castellammare refused to assume any debts from the previous administration of the Pescara universitas. Additionally, Pescara faced an image problem: despite housing an entire military garrison in its fortress, its local role was diminished. From 1807 to 1811, Pescara was not immediately established as an autonomous municipality but was instead incorporated into the government of Francavilla. Consequently, Pescara’s civic authorities pushed for reunification, but a communication from the Ministry of the Interior of the Kingdom of Naples on 17 January 1810 rejected this possibility, forcing the two centers to negotiate debt apportionment. An agreement was reached only in 1811, following the establishment of the Pescara municipality through Law No. 104 of 4 May 1811 "Decree for the new division of the fourteen provinces of the Kingdom of Naples". However, rivalry remained intense, requiring military intervention to prevent skirmishes from escalating into outright battles.

An ancient discord persists between Pescara and Castellammare Adriatico, the two municipalities divided by the beautiful river. The opposing sides frequently engage in offenses and reprisals, each striving to hinder the other's prosperity. Since commerce is now the primary source of wealth, and Pescara already boasts considerable industrial wealth, the people of Castellammare have long sought to attract merchants to their side through every form of cunning and inducement. A rickety wooden bridge spans the river, supported by large, tarred, and chained boats held by moorings. The hatred between the people of Pescara and Castellammare clashes on those worn planks, eroded by daily laborious trade. As Pescara’s industries spill into the Teramo province and flourish, how eagerly the opposing side would cut the ropes and send those seven wretched boats to wreck!

— Gabriele D'Annunzio, The War of the Bridge

=== The Risorgimento ===
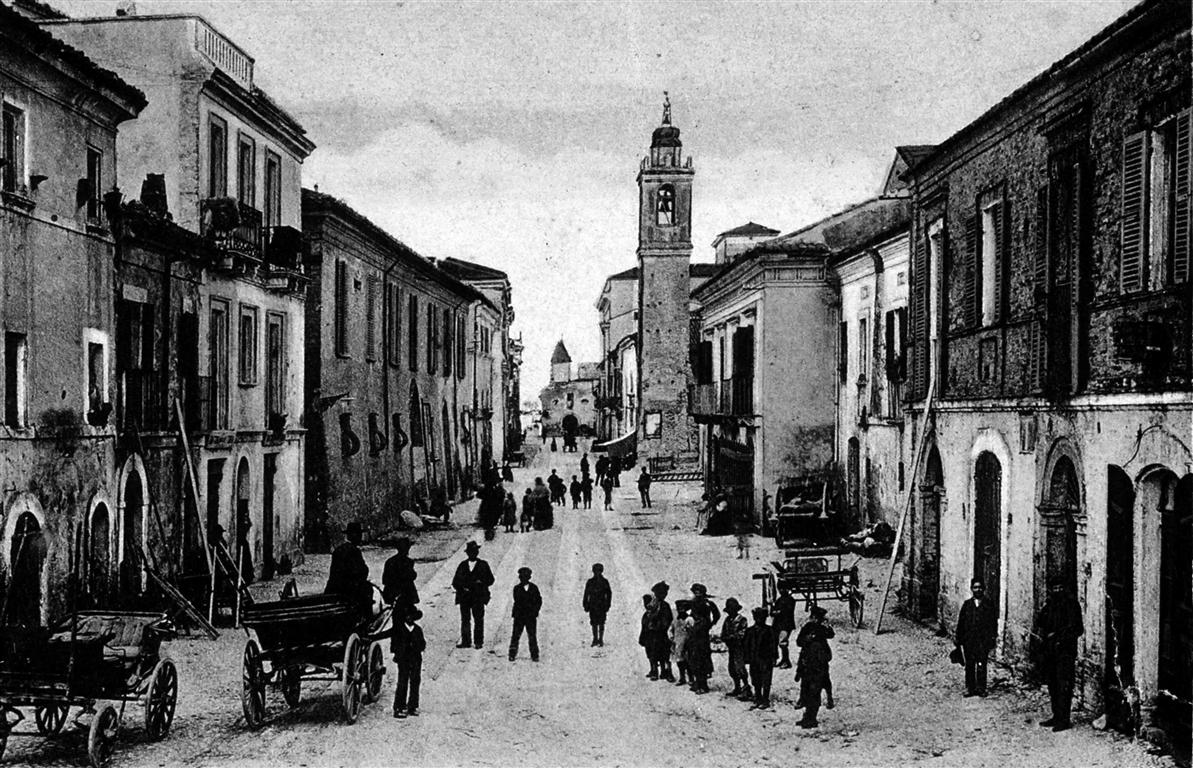
Old Pescara in the early 20th century

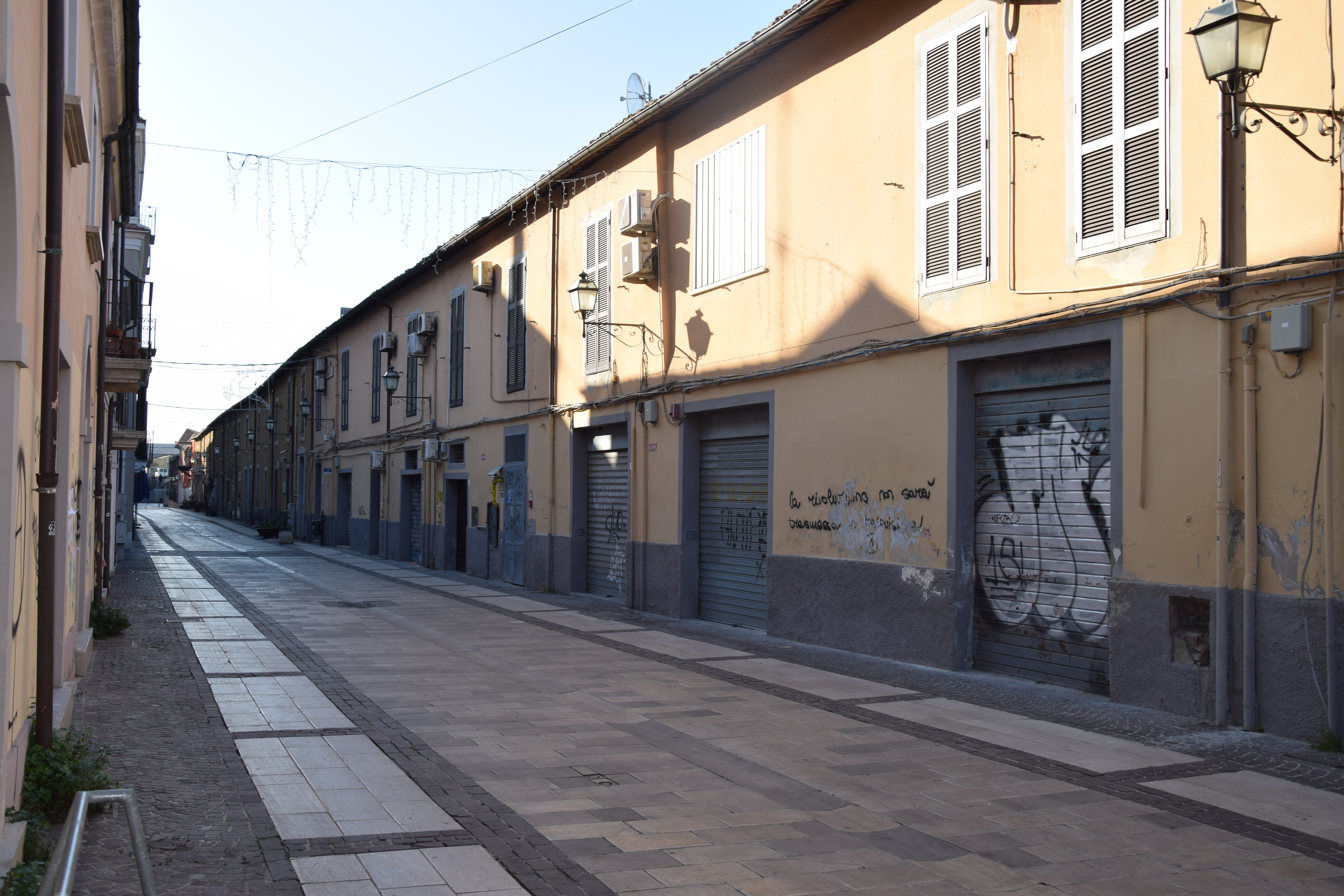
The building of the former Bourbon prison

In 1814, Pescara became a target of the Abruzzese Carbonari uprisings against Joachim Murat, King of Naples. The decision to stage the uprising in Pescara stemmed from the rebels’ intent to capture the strategically important fortress and free the numerous patriots imprisoned there. However, the Carbonari succeeded only in Città Sant'Angelo and other centers of the Vestina area, and the revolt was quickly suppressed.

Following Murat’s fall, the Conservative Order brought the Bourbons back to the Kingdom of Naples, which, united with the Kingdom of Sicily, became the Kingdom of the Two Sicilies.

The fortress, then deemed “the Gateway to the Abruzzi and key to the Kingdom” (a motto also featured in the municipal coat of arms), was restored between 1820 and 1840. In 1831, the ground floor of the infantry barracks was reinforced to house the prison, a symbol of Bourbon repression, where the companions of Carlo Pisacane and other southern patriots, mostly Abruzzese, were detained. The prison was notorious for its inhumane conditions; a devastating flood in October 1857 caused the drowning of inmates. In 1858, the year before its closure, the prison held seventy-five inmates, with an estimated mortality rate of 40%. Among those imprisoned in what was called the “tomb of the living” was Clemente de Caesaris, a central figure in the southern Risorgimento, who, released from confinement in Bovino by order of Giuseppe Garibaldi, took control of the city and fortress in 1860, convincing the garrison to surrender before handing them, along with the rest of the region, to the nascent Kingdom of Italy. In 1837, a new restoration project for the church of Santa Gerusalemme was drafted by Major Engineer Albino Majo, providing detailed insight into the monument. However, this restoration attempt also failed to materialize.

=== Italian unification ===
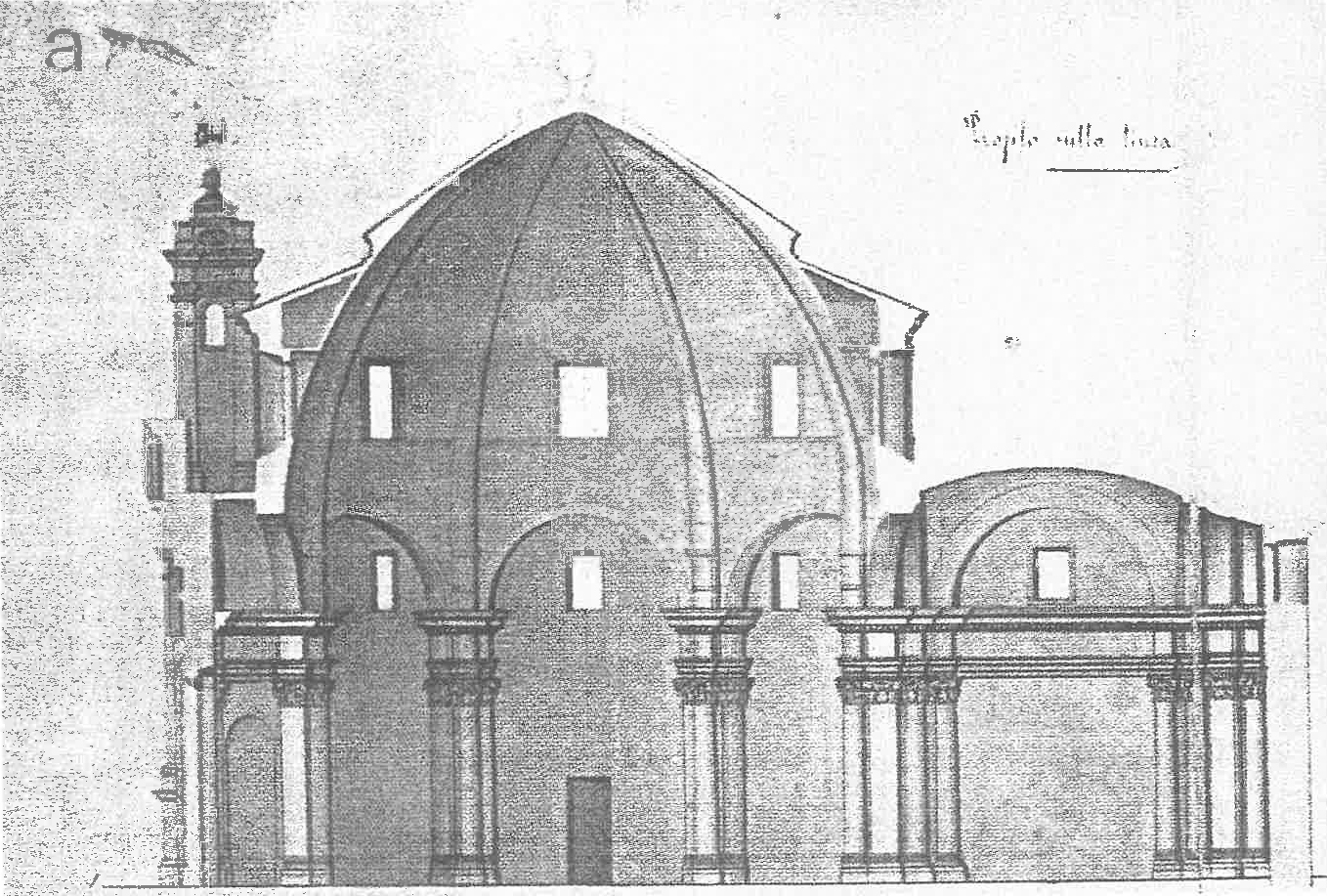
Section of the 1837 restoration project for the church of Santa Gerusalemme, also known as San Cetteo

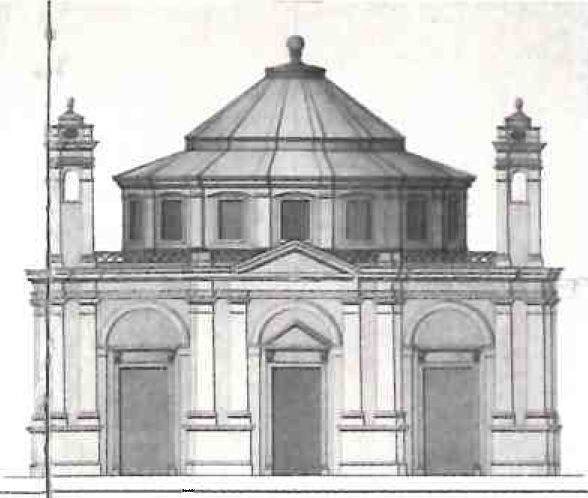
Frontal view of the Santa Gerusalemme restoration project

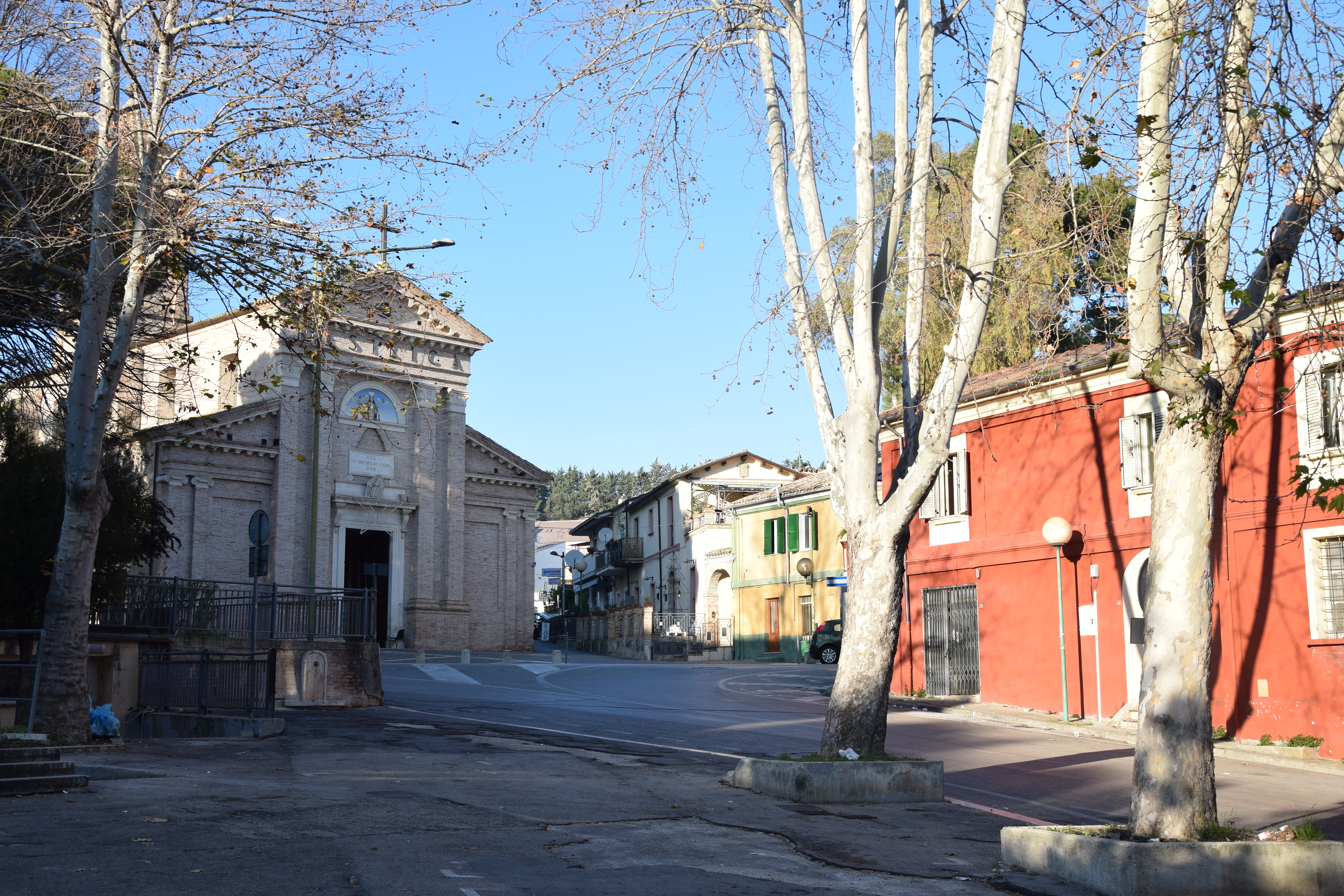
The original core of Castellammare Adriatico, surrounding the Basilica of the Madonna dei Sette Dolori

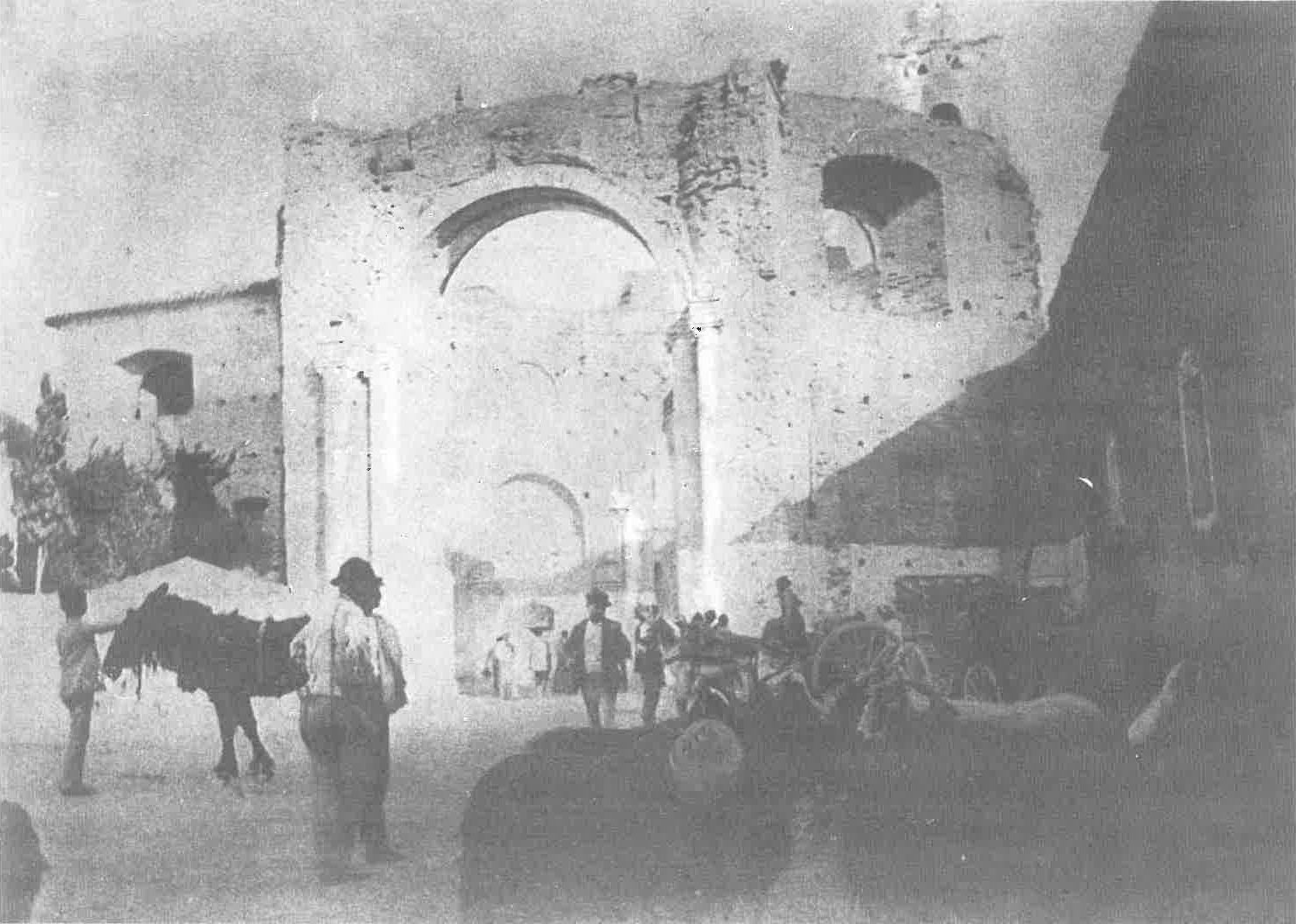
The church of Santa Gerusalemme, partially demolished by the late 19th century, when it began to be known as "Porta Nuova"

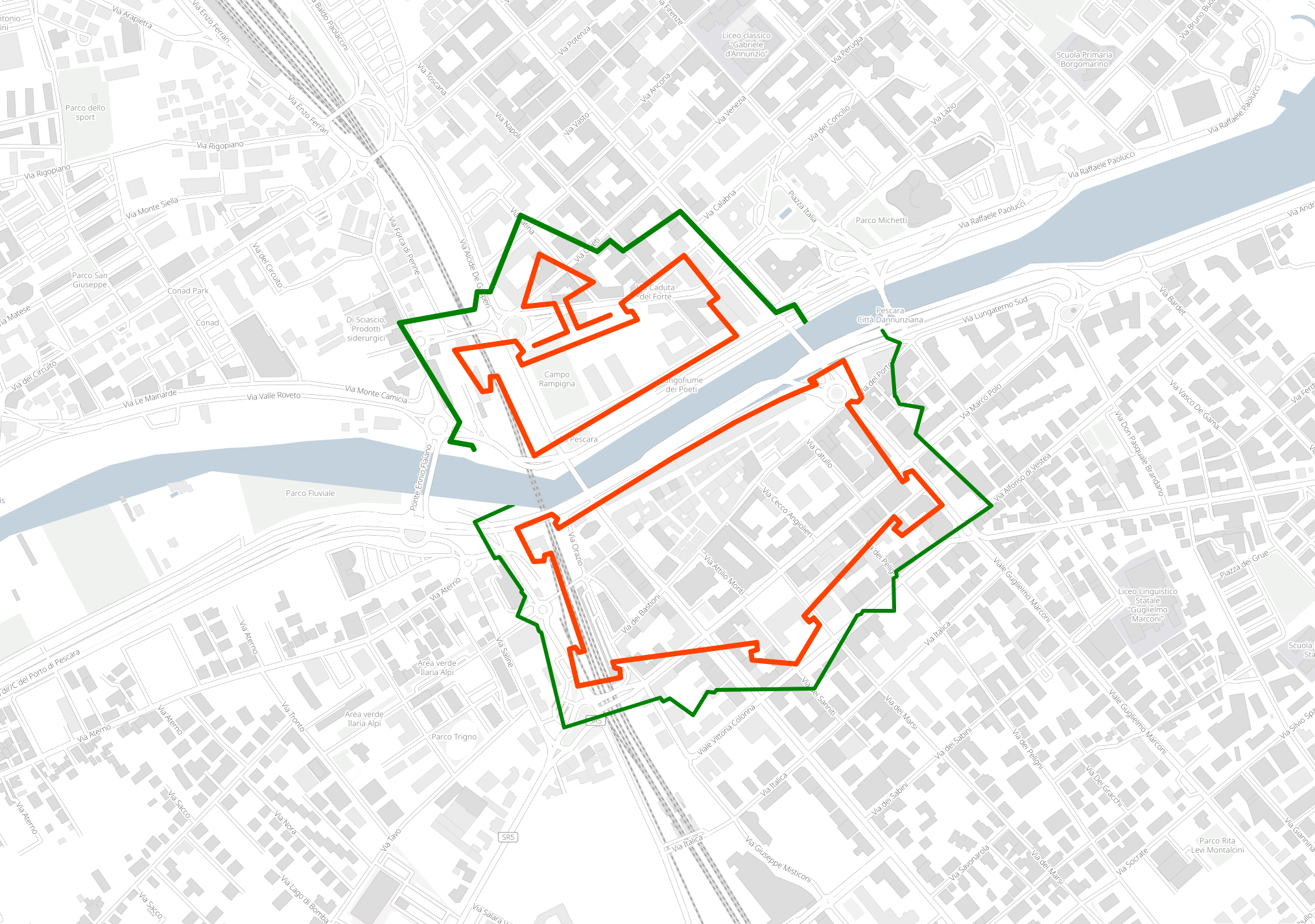
The area occupied by the fortress

On 17 October 1860, as part of the process leading to the formation of the Italian state, Victor Emmanuel II, en route to the Teano meeting with Giuseppe Garibaldi, arrived in Castellammare and was hosted in the Coppa villa, better known as Villa Sabucchi, which was destroyed during World War II. The following day, he entered Pescara on horseback to inspect the fortress, surrounded by a celebrating crowd. He examined the armaments, climbed, and paused at the "Bandiera" bastion, located in the area that would later become Piazza Unione, offering a commanding view of the city’s territory. Turning to the abbot De Marinis beside him, he uttered prophetic words, later inscribed on the municipal tower:

Oh, what a splendid site for a great commercial city! These walls must be torn down, a port built on this river, and in less than a century, Pescara will be the greatest city in the Abruzzi, and our descendants will add it to the hundred cities of which Italy is proud!

— Victor Emmanuel II of Italy

This is attested by a municipal council resolution of 12 December 1869, a letter from the then-mayor, Gennaro Osimani, to the Minister of Finance Quintino Sella dated 19 July 1869, and later by the Marquis Francesco Farina on 26 December 1906.

Castellammare Adriatico and Pescara, with populations of 4,562 and 3,743 respectively in 1861, were incorporated into the Province of Teramo and the Province of Chieti, respectively, maintaining their pre-unification administrative boundaries.

=== The descent to the coast of Castellammare ===
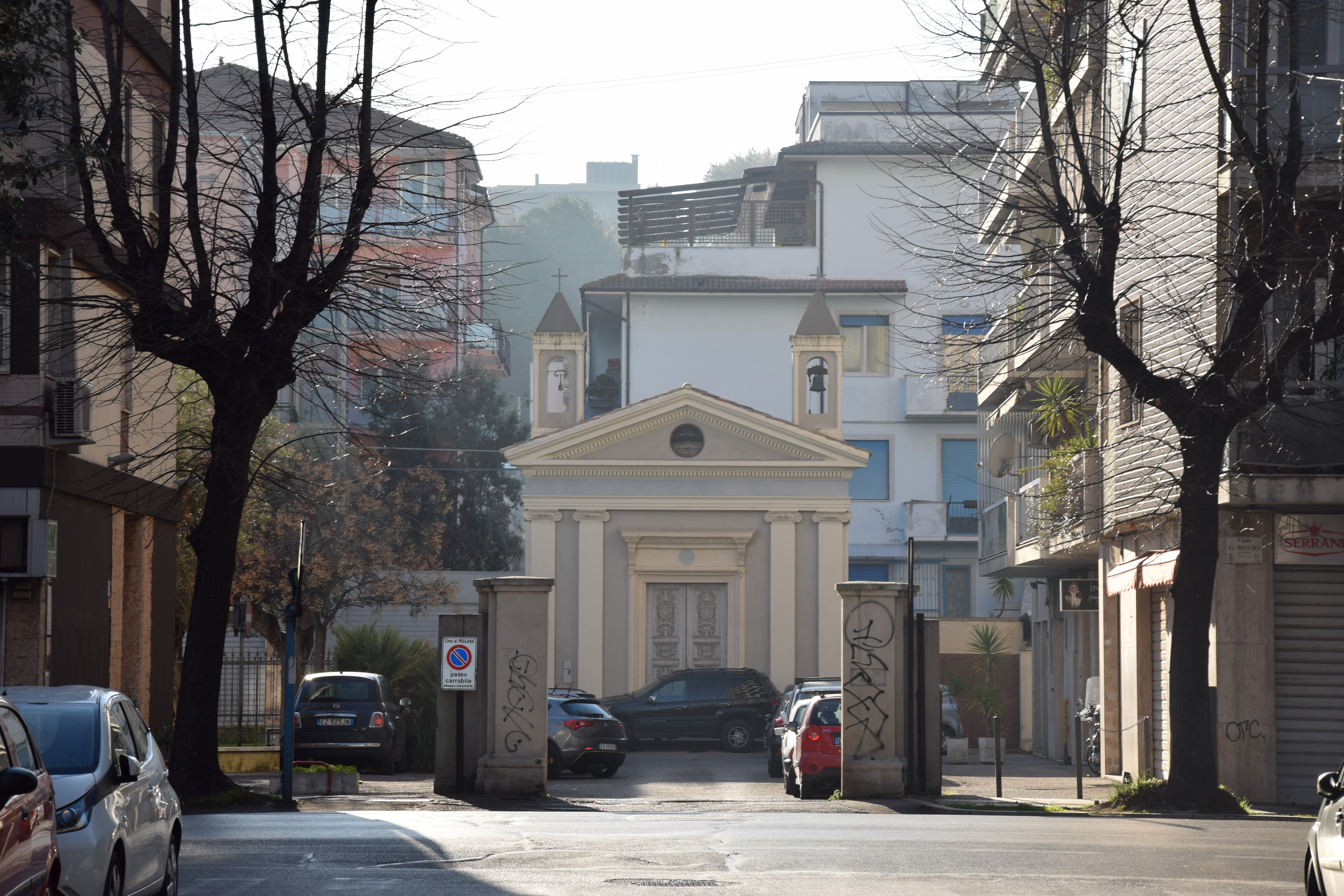
The Sant’Anna chapel, one of the first religious buildings in Castellammare, located within the then Villa Muzii

The late 19th century was profoundly shaped by the political and cultural influence of Leopoldo Muzii, a controversial yet charismatic and influential figure. As mayor of Castellammare Adriatico, he approved the first “Expansion Master Plan” in 1882 and was a key figure in the permanent relocation of the town’s center to the coast, which had previously been limited to scattered settlements along the hillside and a few plots cultivated by wealthy landowners (including himself) in the narrow coastal plain.

The original master plan, developed by Tito Altobelli, divided the city into three areas: a commercial zone to the south, between the station and the river; an administrative zone in the opposite direction, between the station and the Town Hall; and a residential zone north of the Town Hall (then located at the beginning of Viale Muzii). However, Muzii’s interests lay in his own lands (in the area of Via del Milite Ignoto), with the clear intent to enhance their value. He thus pushed to amend the expansion plan to redirect development northward, rather than toward Pescara, which seemed more logical given the inevitable convergence of the two towns.

This was a pivotal moment for Castellammare’s urban and cultural evolution, marking the first significant effort to address urban disorder and curb the landowning ambitions of the Teramo nobility in favor of public interests. Muzii’s policies concretely initiated the settlement of the coastal strip through the construction of a new aqueduct, tree-lined roads, the establishment of the first public lighting lines, and the creation, albeit initially in makeshift and inadequate structures, of the first school buildings.

Gabriele D’Annunzio described Leopoldo Muzii with irony in his work Le novelle della Pescara:

The mayor is a small doctor of law, a knight, all slickly curled, with shoulders dusted with dandruff, with bright little eyes trained in sweet dissimulations. The Great Enemy is a degenerate descendant of the good, enormous Gargantua, puffing, thundering, devouring.

— Gabriele D'Annunzio, Le novelle della Pescara

Leopoldo Muzii, whose contemporaries’ opinions oscillated between accusations of suffocating business-minded paternalism and genuine “socialist” concern for the disadvantaged, was instrumental in transforming Castellammare from a small hillside settlement into a modern coastal town equipped with infrastructure that enabled its exponential growth in subsequent decades. His closeness to the working class was frequently noted by D’Annunzio, and a small but significant episode is remembered in local lore: during a cholera epidemic in the hills, Muzii, along with other citizens, fearlessly went to aid and comfort the afflicted. Upon his death from peritonitis on 22 March 1903, “the realization that a fortunate moment had been lost for a long time was immediate, and the city authorities paid him every honor”. They named the street of the Castellammare Town Hall after him, previously known as Via Marilungo, and placed a plaque on his house at Viale Bovio 71, reading: “Here lived, worked, and died the distinguished mind of Leopoldo Muzii”.

=== Arrival of the Adriatic railway ===
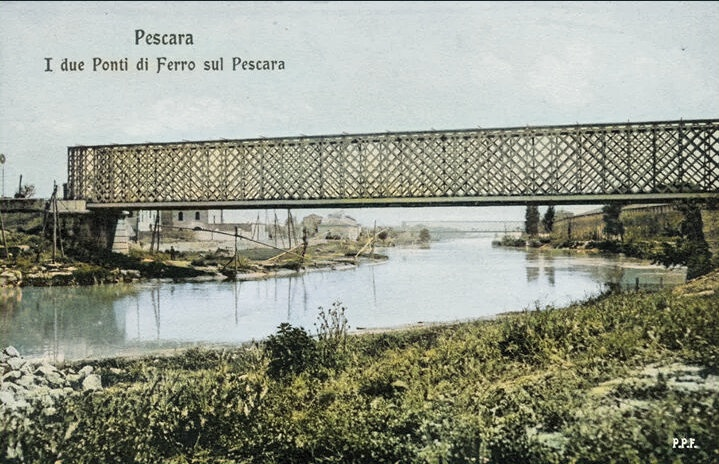
The Pescara bridges in the early 20th century; in the foreground, the railway bridge, and in the background, the metal road bridge

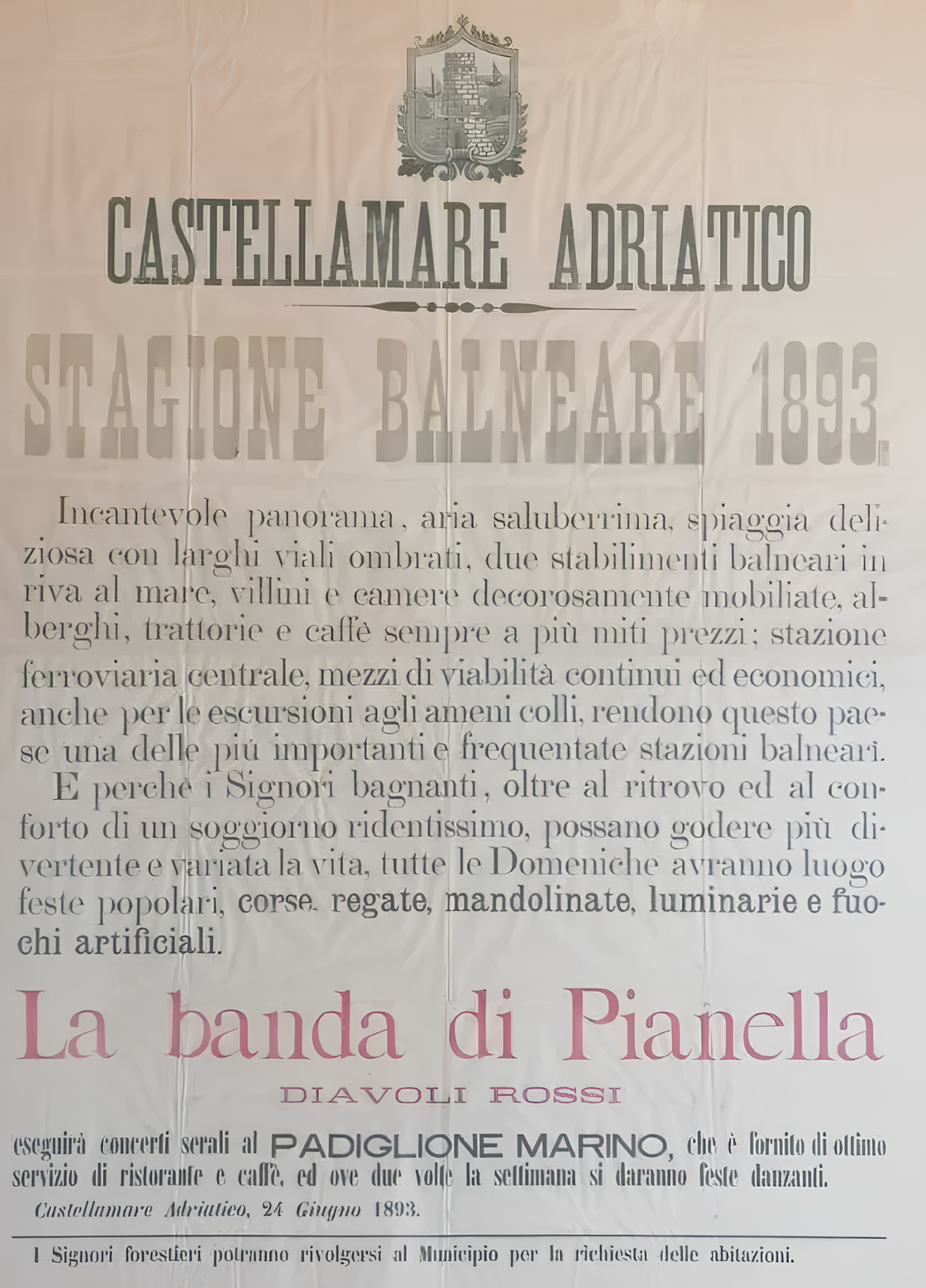
Promotional poster for the 1893 summer season in Castellammare Adriatico

Meanwhile, in Pescara, reclamation and sanitation works progressed in the marshy areas, and initial steps were taken to demolish the fortress walls. The fortress was purchased from the Ministry of the Treasury on 24 March 1871 for 106,676 lire, approximately 500,000 €. The city expanded toward the Pineta Dannunziana and its beaches, an area central to an ambitious 1912 project by Antonino Liberi to create a garden city in Liberty style within the newly reclaimed pine forest. This followed a classic 19th-century urban layout of cardo and decumanus but was only partially realized. Despite Liberi’s claim that the ancient feudal family “deliberately committed vandalism,” it was his idea to name the developing seaside resort “Pineta D’Avalos”. Following the failure of prior restoration efforts, and likely without the city authorities recognizing the monument’s historical value, the church of Santa Gerusalemme was hastily demolished: first the large chapel at the entrance in 1871, then the central rotunda in 1892, and finally the eastern chamber and adjacent bell tower in 1902. Thus, the last monumental remnant of the Roman city of Aterno was lost. The bases of the few surviving columns, located several meters below street level, were discovered in 1992 and are now preserved in glass cases at numbers 8, 10, and 12 of Viale Gabriele D’Annunzio, directly opposite the San Cetteo Cathedral. Urban expansion was primarily measured in terms of extent, and the lack of hydraulic-sanitary infrastructure, such as aqueducts and sewers, and territorial defenses exacerbated epidemics like the cholera outbreaks of 1884 (described by D’Annunzio in “The War of the Bridge”) and 1885, as well as the floods of 1887 and 1888, made more destructive by the embankments of the Adriatic railway construction sites. The railway infrastructure, built by the Company for the Southern Railways, with its disregard for environmental conditions and focus on minimizing costs, worsened the surrounding marshy areas, increasing health risks for the population. Exposed to periodic epidemics of malaria, typhoid fever, and cholera, the population received no compensation; the company, while denying all charges, limited itself to partially financing the cleaning of the drainage canals. Challenges also arose from the fortress itself, difficult to remove, and especially from the need for a secure, stable bridge to connect the two banks after the collapse of the ancient Roman masonry bridge and the inadequacy of the boat bridge, recalled by D’Annunzio, which had replaced it for centuries. This sparked disputes between Pescara and Castellammare, with Pescara’s leaders divided between those opposing cooperation with their “hated” neighbors and those advocating for reunification. The contention centered on the location of the iron bridge (replaced in 1933 by the masonry “Littorio” bridge): some wanted it upstream (where the D’Annunzio bridge would be built in 1959) to emphasize separation from the Teramo side, while others favored alignment with one of Castellammare’s main streets. The latter prevailed, and the bridge was inaugurated on 27 April 1893 at Corso Vittorio Emanuele II. The crossing, replaced after World War II by the newly built Risorgimento bridge, remains the city's main thoroughfare.

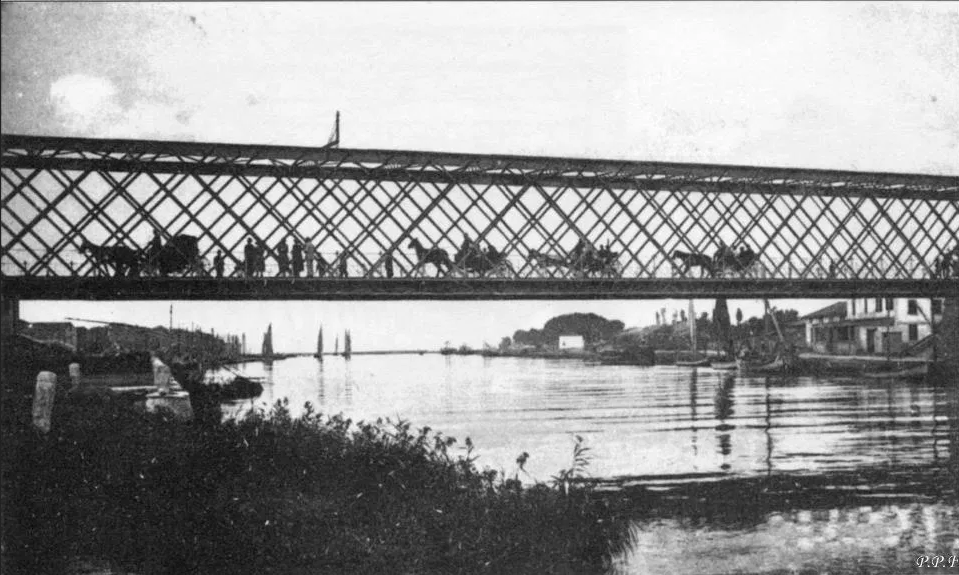
The 1893 road bridge, predecessor to the Littorio and Risorgimento bridges

The city still had serious deficiencies in terms of public hygiene, social infrastructure, hospitals, schools, sewers, and running and drinking water. Many of these issues remained unresolved throughout the 19th century. The opening of the Adriatic railway in 1863 marked the beginning of significant social and economic development for both towns. The Castellammare station (later renamed Pescara Centrale station), initially a small wooden structure, was activated on 16 May 1863 by then-Prince Umberto I with an inaugural journey on the newly completed Ancona-Pescara line, followed in November by King Victor Emmanuel II for the Pescara-Foggia line. By 1881, the Pescara station (since 1927 Pescara Porta Nuova railway station) was completed. In 1908, after decades of debate and conflicting proposals, the two towns, now popular seaside resorts, completed the canal port project. The towns grew due to new commercial and tourist flows facilitated by the railway stations, port infrastructure, and rising living standards. Beyond these activities, few other economic initiatives existed, especially after the Minister of War Alessandro Della Rovere removed Pescara’s defense post on 27 November 1864, abolishing the related military servitude and the three-hundred-year-old economy tied to the military garrison. Meanwhile, the municipality expanded inland, incorporating Fontanelle in 1868 and much of the San Silvestro municipality in 1879.

=== Early 20th century ===
The walls of Pescara, the brick arch, the cracked church, the square with its weathered trees, the corner of my neglected house. It is my little homeland. It is as sensitive as my skin here and there. It freezes me, it warms me. What is old touches me, what is new repulses me. My anguish carries all its people and all its ages.

— Gabriele D'Annunzio, Notturno

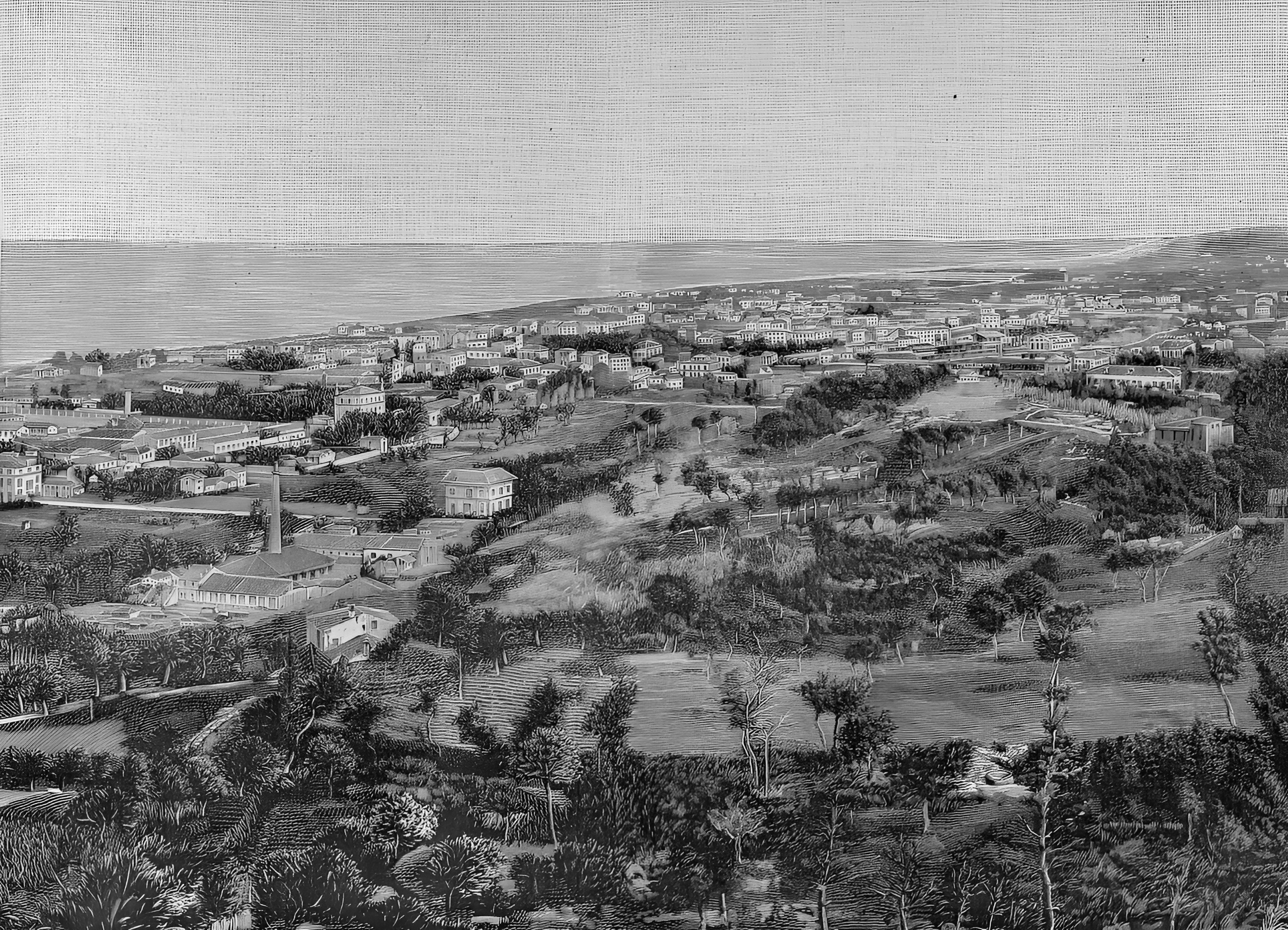
Castellammare Adriatico in a 1901 woodcut

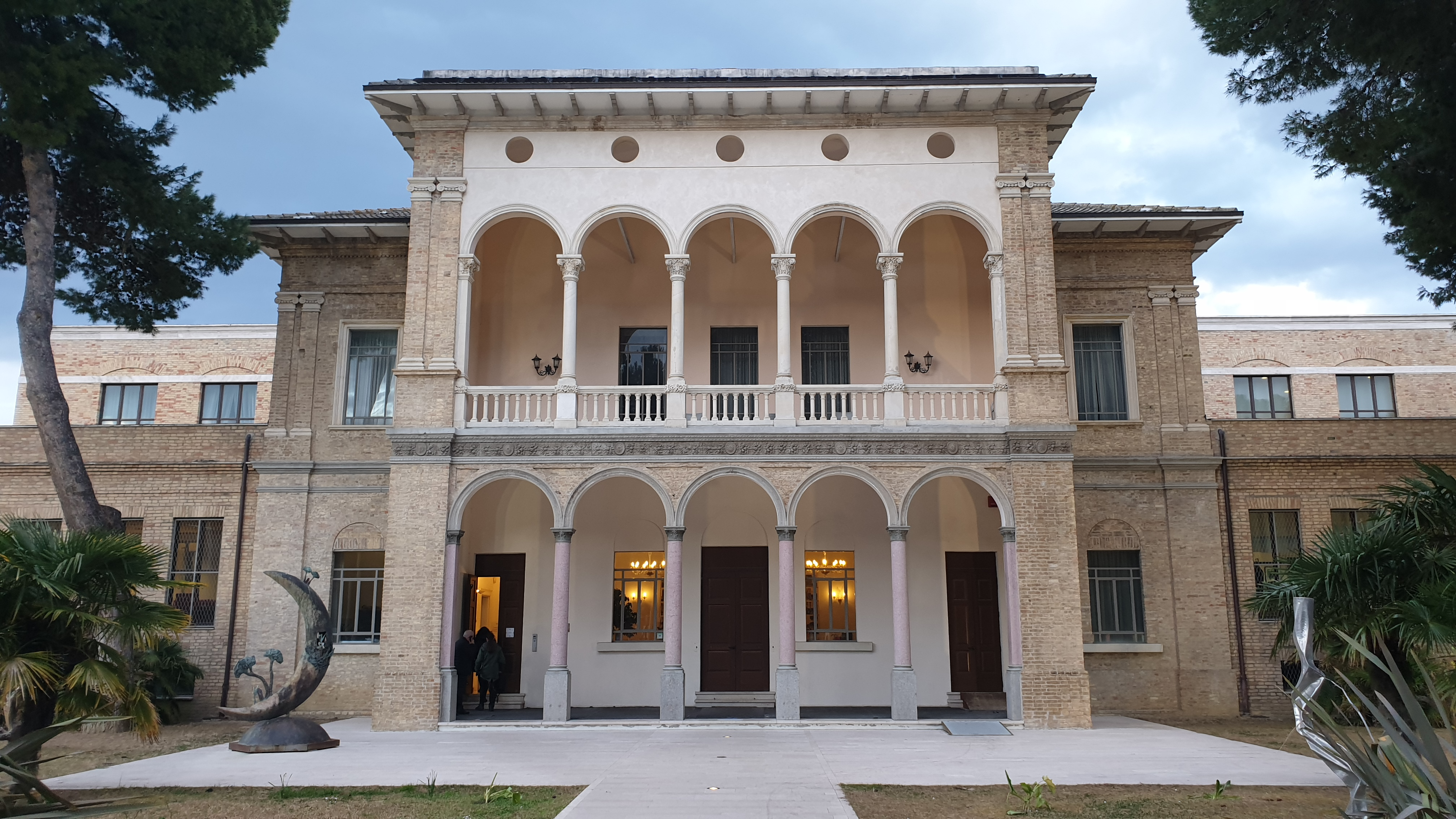
The 1910 Kursaal, later transformed into the Aurum distillery

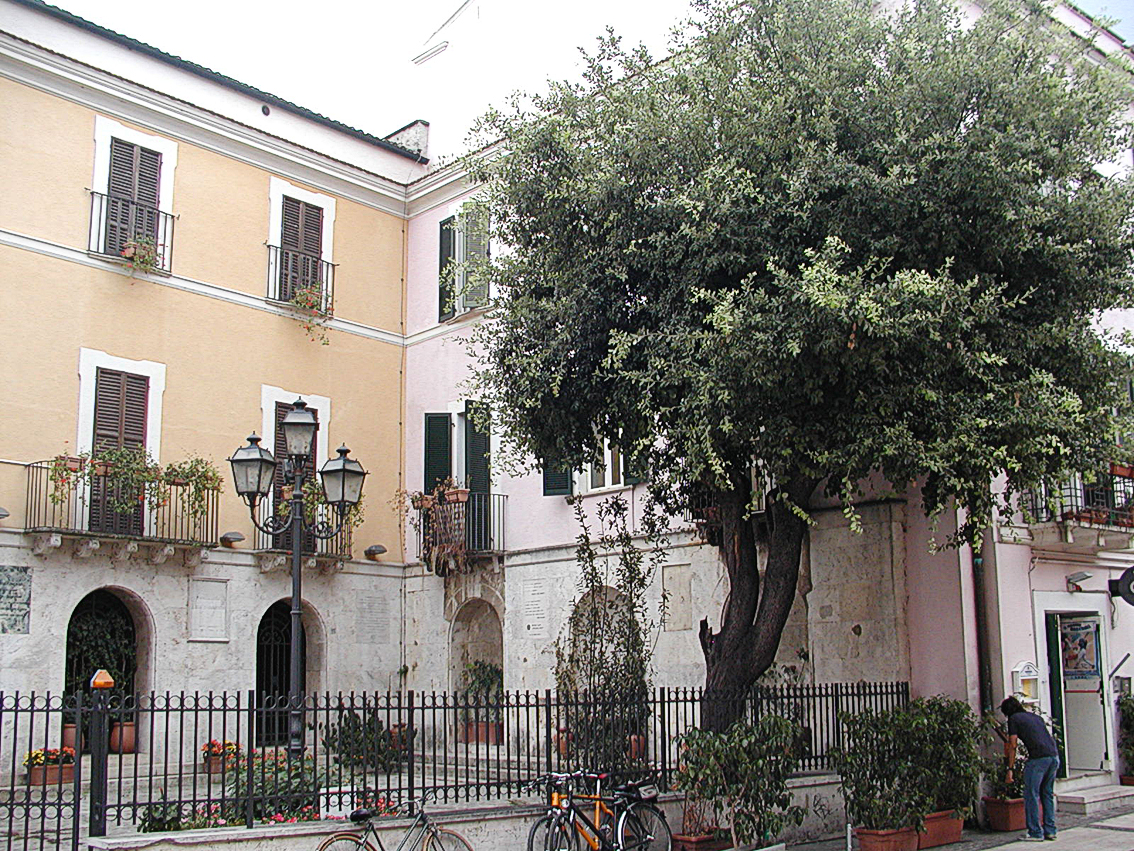
The backyard of Gabriele D’Annunzio’s birth house

In the 1901 census, the population of the two Pescara municipalities totaled 16,033 residents, with 8,926 in Castellammare and 7,107 in Pescara. Despite the presence of extensive malarial zones in Pescara, as defined by the 1902 royal decree on malarial areas, the inclination toward seaside tourism solidified. By 1905, Castellammare Adriatico’s hotels hosted around four thousand tourists. The city began to allocate spaces for textile and food markets. Additionally, the municipality on the right bank of the river underwent significant urban transformation, particularly through the gradual civilian repurposing of the former fortress areas, whose materials were reused for new public buildings or sold.

Over the decades, rivalries between the two riverbanks subsided, while cooperation and shared goals for development increased. The enhancement of the canal port was a key point of collaboration between the two administrations. In the summer of 1908, Carlo Mezzanotte, a deputy from Chieti, presented a bill to the Chamber of Deputies for the merger of Pescara and Castellammare Adriatico. Although the proposal, which included incorporating Castellammare into the Province of Chieti, remained unimplemented, it highlighted the growing inevitability of unification in public discourse, spurred by the canal port’s construction.

On 4 May 1917, toward the end of World War I, the Castellammare side experienced an incursion by the Austrian air force, which caused minimal material damage (three deaths—two women and one man—and the destruction of the railway workers’ dormitory and canteen near the station) but underscored the encroaching impact of global events on the two towns. The victims are commemorated by a small plaque at Corso Vittorio Emanuele II 253. To prevent further attacks, the Ministry of War established an airfield along Via Tiburtina with two fighter planes, which later became the Pescara Airport.

=== Post-World War I period ===
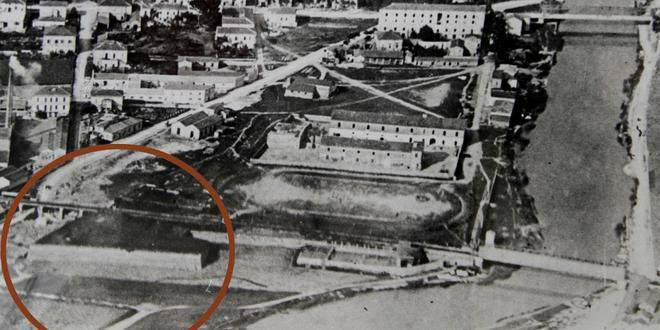
The San Vitale bastion of the fortress, largely demolished, in the 1920s

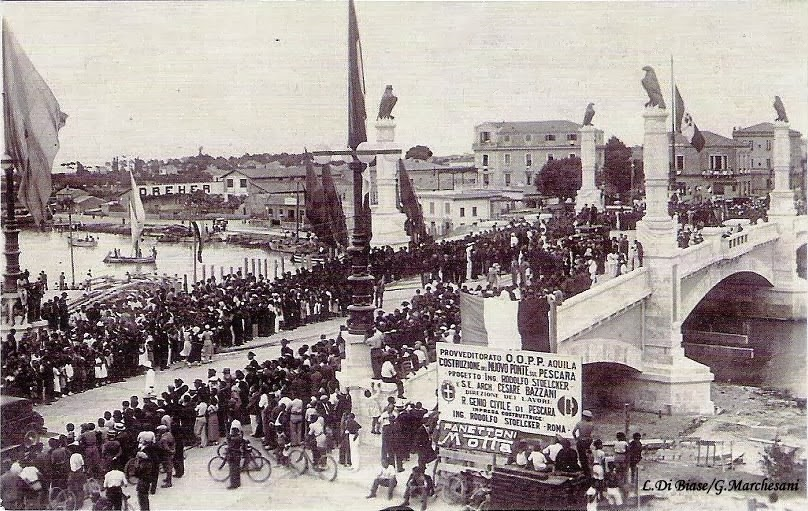
Inauguration of the Littorio bridge in 1933. The bridge was mined and destroyed by retreating Germans on 9 June 1944, during World War II

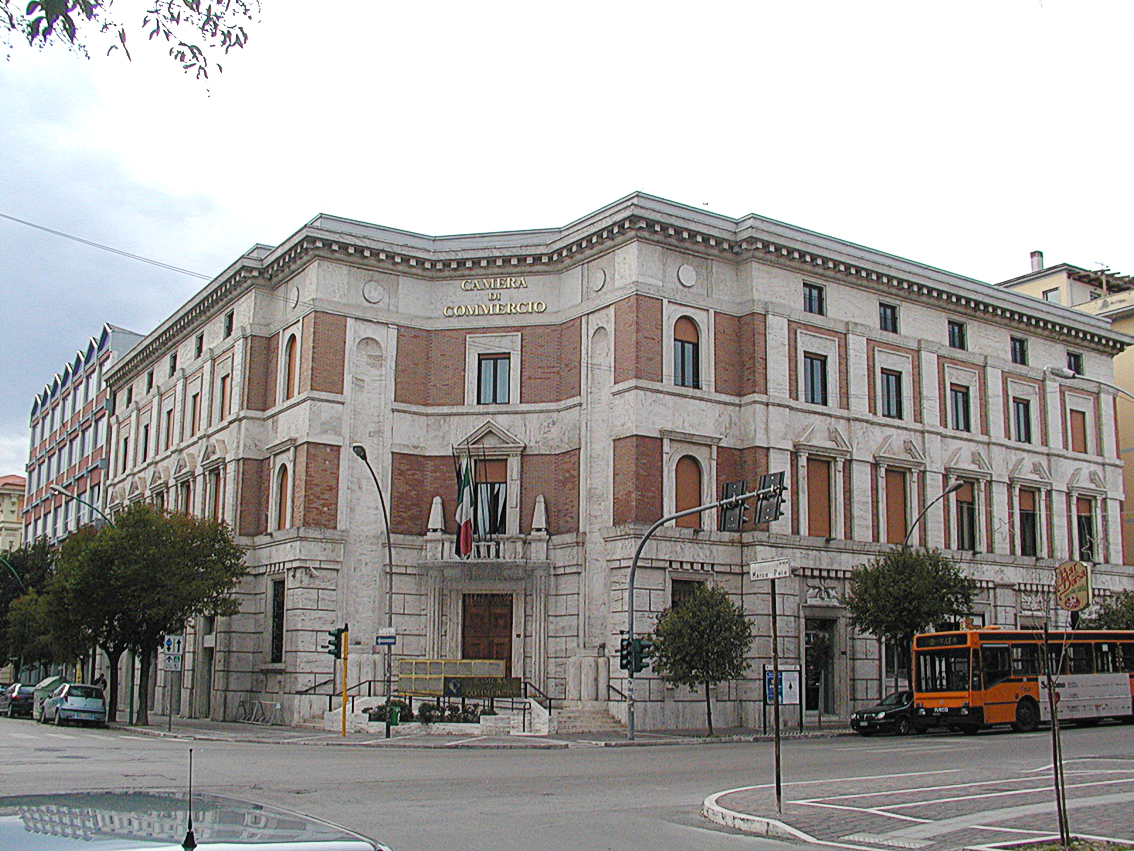
Chamber of Commerce of Pescara, built in 1934

At the end of World War I, the two towns remained quite distinct: Pescara was commercial, artisanal, and “popular,” while Castellammare Adriatico was bourgeois, refined, and touristic, characterized by the grand villas of landowners.

A concrete step toward unification occurred in the winter of 1918: on November 30, the two municipal councils met simultaneously, voted on the same agenda, and committed to petitioning the Orlando government to decree the merger of the municipalities. However, the only outcome that year was an agreement for the joint management of the horse-drawn tram service. A Castellammare proposal the following year for a shared hospital failed to materialize due to lack of support from Pescara, leading Castellammare to establish its own initial healthcare facility.

Negotiations to define the residents of both banks and establish the new province were extensive, particularly regarding the name of the unified community. It was clear that merging the municipalities would drive rapid administrative, economic, industrial, and commercial progress. Compromises were sought to name the unified city “Aterno” (with “Castelpescara” also considered).

In subsequent years, the two administrations collaborated to advocate for the merger, with decisive efforts from Gabriele D’Annunzio, who, on 16 May 1924, wrote to Mussolini requesting the unification of the two cities and their elevation to provincial capital status. Abruzzese deputy Giacomo Acerbo also worked toward this goal.

Economically, the city saw new commercial and industrial developments, while tourism flourished, with Castellammare Adriatico’s beaches becoming a nationally recognized destination. In 1924, under the political impetus of Minister Giacomo Acerbo, the Coppa Acerbo was organized in Castellammare Adriatico, quickly becoming one of the era’s most prominent car races and attracting tens of thousands of visitors. During this period, the first factories and industrial activities emerged, such as the Puritas pasta factory of Angelo Delfino, the Verrocchio furnace at Madonna dei Sette Dolori, the Forlani furnace on Via Caravaggio, and the Camplone Foundries on Via Tiburtina. The port began to gain importance, with increasing commercial traffic volumes, aided by the river’s navigability, widely used for transporting materials to and from the Abruzzese hinterland.

=== City reunification and establishment of the province ===
After 120 years of division, the Province of Pescara was established on 2 January 1927, including the municipality of Castellammare. Article four of the decree stated: “The municipality of Castellammare Adriatico is united with that of Pescara”.

Coat of arms of Pescara until 1927

Coat of arms of Castellammare Adriatico

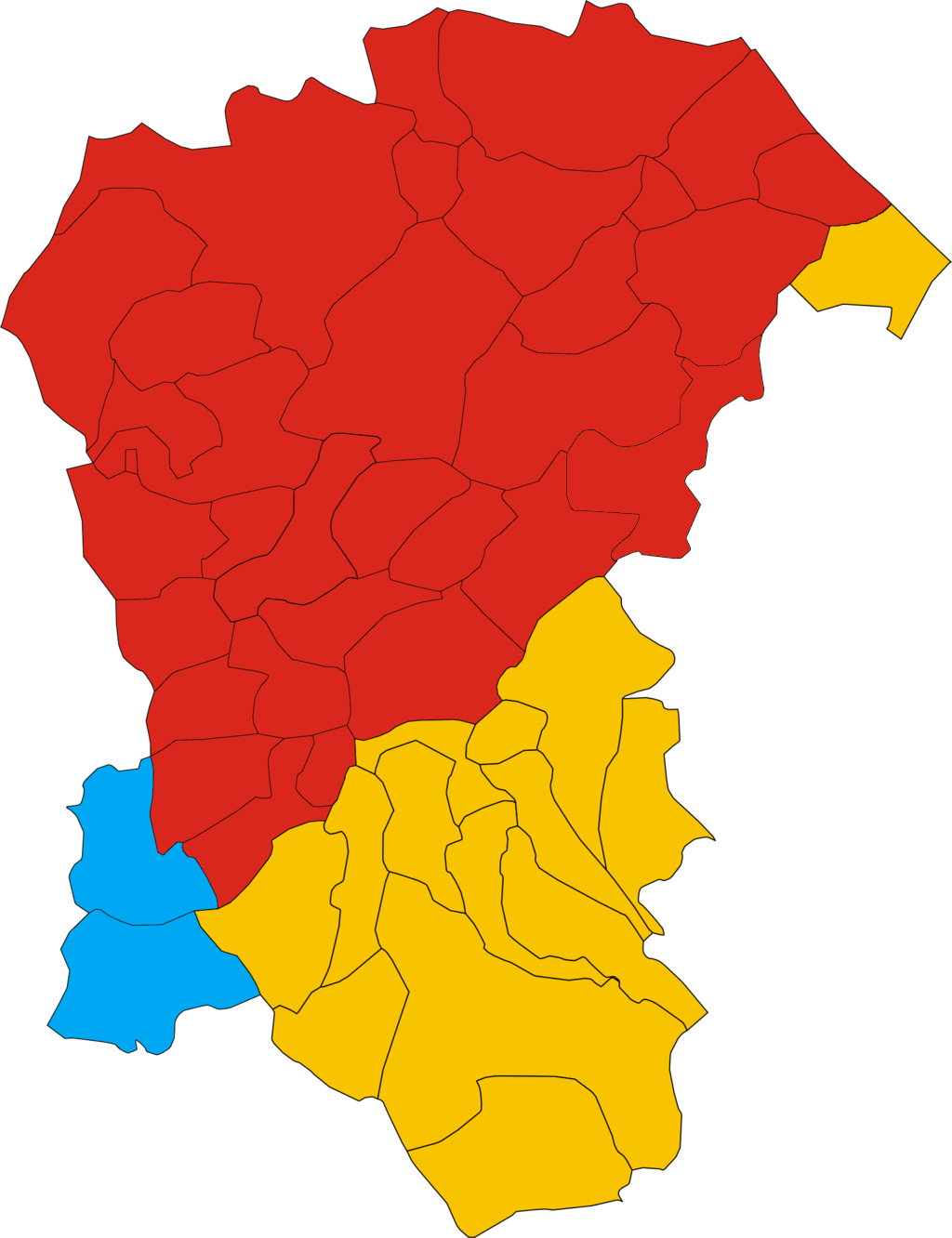
The new province: in red, municipalities from the Province of Teramo; in yellow, those from the Province of Chieti; in blue, those from the Province of L’Aquila

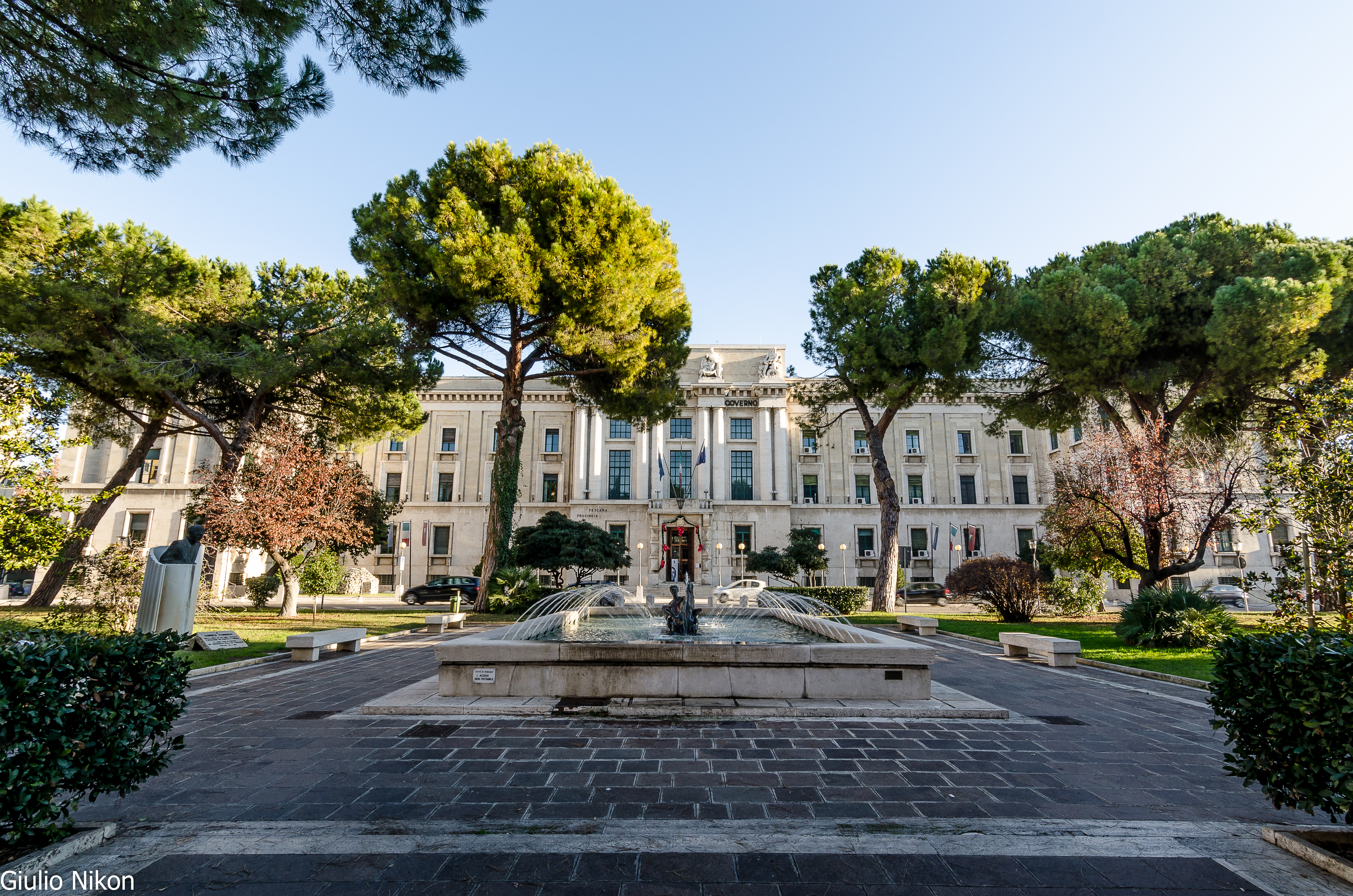
Palazzo del Governo, seat of the province

The measure, part of a broader Italian territorial reorganization by the fascist regime, was driven by strong popular support and, crucially, the political authority of deputy and future Minister of Agriculture Giacomo Acerbo and the prestige of Gabriele D’Annunzio within the regime.

The intended name for the unified city was “Aterno,” but D’Annunzio’s influence on Mussolini ensured that Pescara prevailed, as Mussolini declared he would never “sacrifice the name of the poet’s birthplace on the altar of peace”. On 6 December 1926, Mussolini telegraphed D’Annunzio, who was in Gardone Riviera, with the news:

Today I have elevated your Pescara to a provincial capital. I inform you because I believe it will please you. I embrace you.

D’Annunzio replied:

I am delighted with the great news and am certain that my old Pescara, rejuvenated, will become ever more industrious and daring to prove itself worthy of the privilege you grant it today. I embrace you.

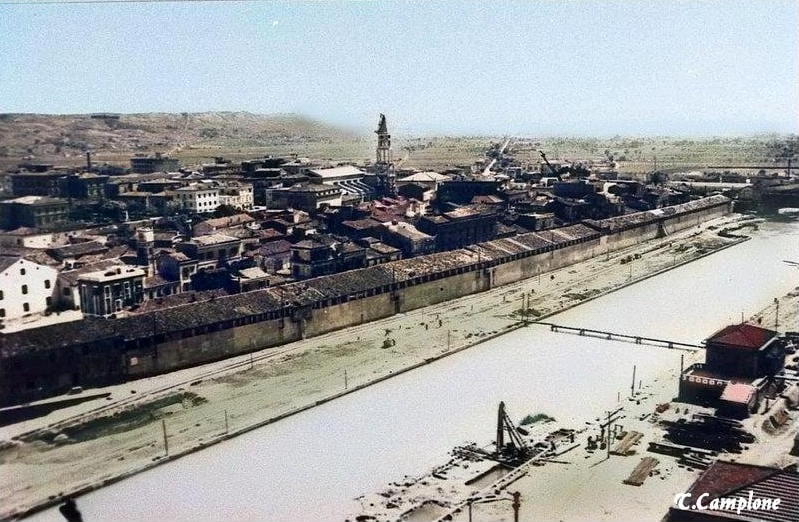
Overview of the historic center in the 1930s

The response from Castellammare Adriatico’s then-prefectural commissioner, Baron De Landerset, was less enthusiastic but laced with subtle irony:

Castellammare is pleased to sacrifice its name to contribute, with deeds and faith, to the exaltation of your native city.

The new province incorporated all the centers of the Vestina area from the Province of Teramo, except the municipalities of the Bisenti district, as well as municipalities from the northwestern slope of the Maiella from the Province of Chieti, alongside Pescara itself. From the Province of L’Aquila, the municipalities of Popoli and Bussi sul Tirino were transferred, forming Abruzzo’s fourth province, the region’s smallest and one of Italy’s least extensive, covering 1,230.33 square kilometres (475.03 sq mi) and administering forty-six municipalities. The establishment reflected the changing economic conditions of these territories. Between 1901 and 1921, the combined population of Castellammare Adriatico and Pescara grew by 61.3%, compared to 19.1% for Chieti, 10% for L’Aquila, and 9.2% for Teramo. In the 1927 Census of Industry and Commerce, conducted months after Pescara’s elevation to provincial capital, only L’Aquila, Pescara, and Teramo were deemed “industrially significant” among Abruzzese capitals, with Pescara standing out with 658 businesses and 4,812 employees. The new administrative structure solidified the shift of Abruzzo’s economic center toward the coast.

=== The fascist era ===
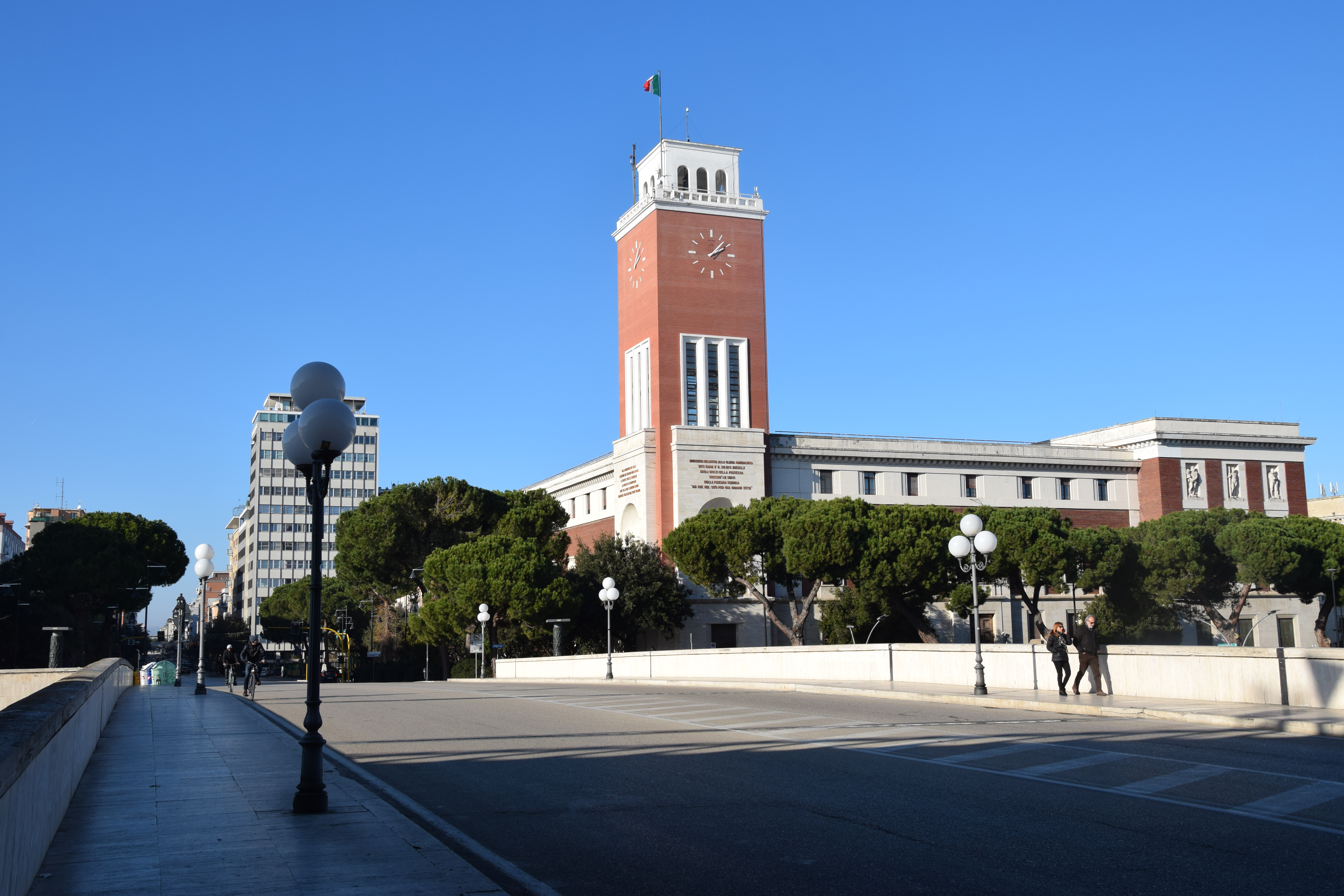
The Palazzo di Città, completed in 1935 by architect Vincenzo Pilotti. The bell tower was destroyed during World War II and rebuilt immediately after

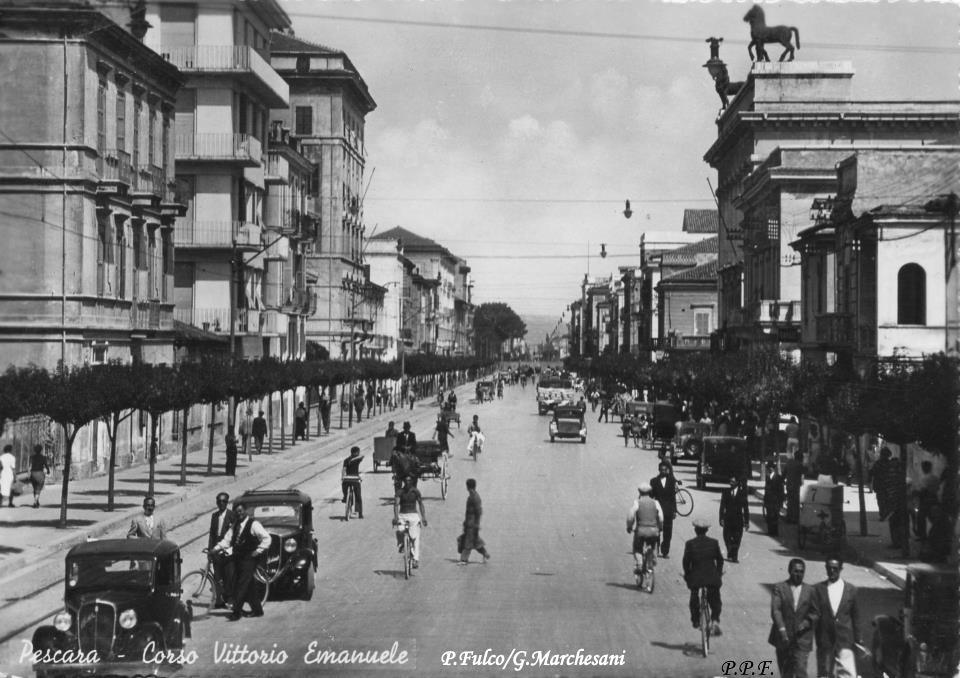
Corso Vittorio Emanuele II in the 1930s

After unification and elevation to provincial capital, Pescara experienced significant industrial and construction growth, with new public administration buildings, schools, markets, and the city’s first true hospital, “Santo Spirito” Hospital. Several public buildings from this period, such as the Palazzo di Città, the Palazzo del Governo, and schools such as the Gabriele D’Annunzio Classical Lyceum, retained their functions in the period following World War II. However, the prefecture building at the intersection of Viale D’Annunzio and Viale Vittoria Colonna was destroyed in the 1943 bombings. The “La Pescara” rowing club, supported by D’Annunzio, who was its honorary president and coined its motto Arranca sotto, was also expanded during this time.

In February 1928, the municipality of Spoltore was annexed to Pescara but regained autonomy in 1947. Among the significant public works was the Littorio bridge, which, while part of the regime’s glorification, also celebrated the reunification of the two municipalities and symbolized the city’s evolution. Designed by Cesare Bazzani, it replaced the old iron structure, clad in Ascoli travertine and Sardinian granite, and adorned with four columns supporting four bronze eagles by sculptor Ernesto Brozzi. Each base bore an elegiac couplet in Latin, composed and translated by Domenico Tinozzi, the province’s president, physician, and scholar:

The Littorio bridge now unites the limbs of the twin cities,
four eagles proudly guard this work.
It stands as a most gratifying pledge of the great Leader’s love for our people,
a propitious omen of harmony for hearts.
Pescara, once the emporium and honor of the Sabellic peoples, renewed,
now stands as a vigilant sentinel of our sea.
With the gentle murmur of its waves, this river resounds the pure songs
that inspired its Winged Poet.

— Pons geminas urbis lictorius adligat oras:
quattor hoc aquilae rite tuentur opus
Stat ducis huic populo pergratum pignus amoris
perpetuum et faustum cordibus auspicium
Urbs renovata decus gentis portusque Sabellae
excubat ad nostrum pervigilatque mare
Hoc resonat flumen lympharum murmure leni
aligeri vatis carmina pura sui

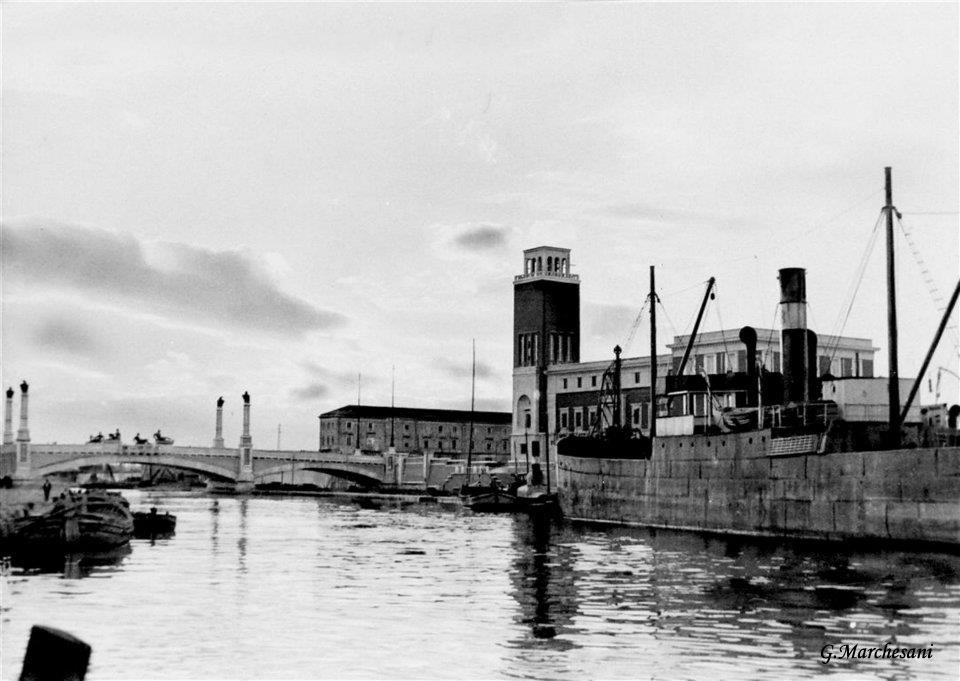
The canal port in the 1930s

In 1935, four large bronze female statues, allegories of Abruzzo’s main resources—Mountain, Sea, River, and Fertile Plain—crafted by Abruzzese sculptor Nicola D’Antino, were added to the bridge. By 1939, reclamation works in Portanuova were completed, enabling the development of the “Marina” district. The San Cetteo Cathedral, commissioned and partially funded by Gabriele D’Annunzio, began construction in 1933 and was completed in 1938, named the “Temple of Conciliation” in reference to the Lateran Pacts and the reconciliation between state and church. It replaced the dilapidated Chapel of the Blessed Sacrament, previously known as San Cetteo.

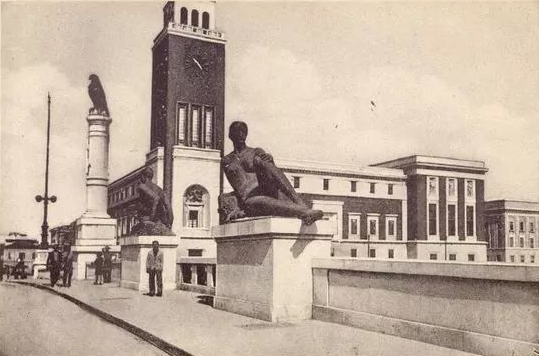
The Palazzo di Città seen from the Littorio bridge

Other infrastructure emerged, such as the Pescara-Penne railway in 1929 and the city’s airport, then called “Campo di Fortuna di Pescara,” which was expanded to fifty hectares and modernized. On 25 June 1928, by ministerial decree, it was renamed after Pasquale Liberi, a Pescara aviator, at D’Annunzio’s request. Awarded a bronze medal, he died in a flight accident in Mestre on 19 June 1921, and is commemorated by a stele within the airport. Buried in Pescara’s San Silvestro cemetery, D’Annunzio remembered him in a letter to his friend’s father:

… he was a small, cheerful, and frank hero, a joyful friend of danger, a young lover of death who seemed to always carry the red carnation of his beloved at his ear…

In the 1936 census, the last before World War II, Pescara (which had surpassed its historical provincial capital, Chieti, in earlier 1931 counts) recorded 45,445 inhabitants, making it Abruzzo’s second-largest city after L’Aquila’s 51,160, followed by Teramo with 33,796 and Chieti with 30,266.

=== World War II ===
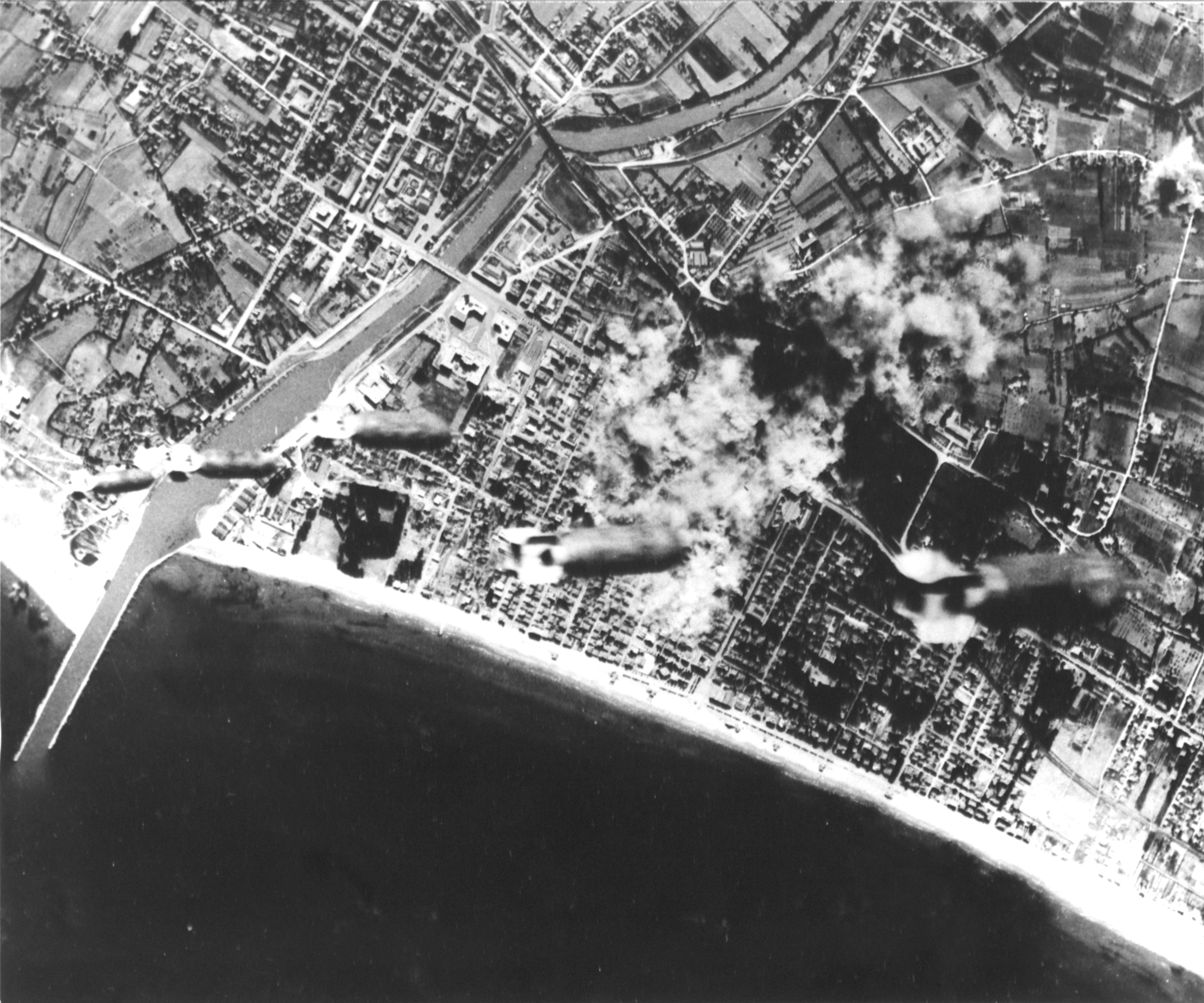
Aerial view of one of the city’s bombardments

Unlike many Italian cities regularly bombed from the early stages of World War II, Pescara had no direct contact with the war until late August 1943. Normal activities, such as going to the beach or taking evening strolls, continued, despite sporadic alerts and the blackout in effect. Even the arrival of refugees from other southern cities did not alarm the population or authorities, who believed the war would only affect larger centers.

The bombardments of Pescara aimed to disrupt the German army’s supply lines, which heavily relied on the Pescara railway hub connecting to Rome and northern Italy. Despite the intensity of the Allied attacks on the Gustav Line and the efforts of Abruzzese partisans from the Maiella Brigade, German defenses in this sector were tenacious. The clashes, which culminated in the Battle of Ortona, continued for several more months than expected, persisting until the beginning of June 1944.

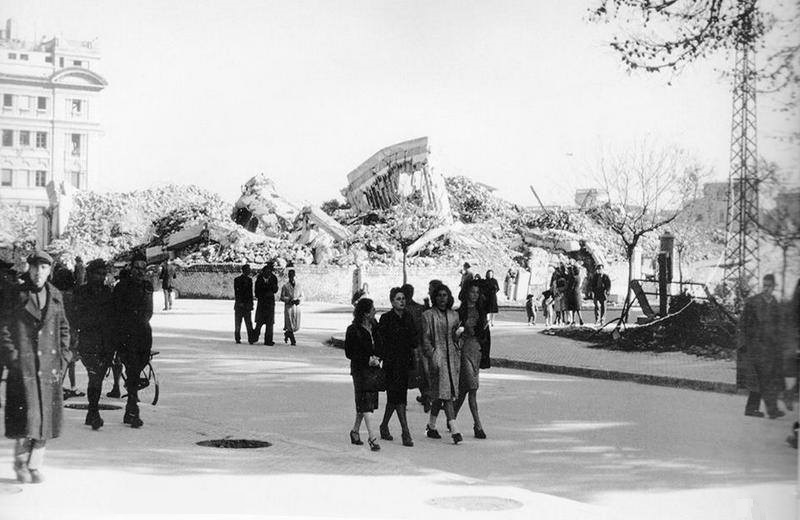
Rubble in Via Carducci

The first Allied aerial reconnaissance over the city occurred on 6 April 1943, identifying strategic targets such as the airport, railway station, and river crossings. The bombings consisted of five major raids and several minor ones between August and December 1943, in a city where no air-raid shelters were built despite various plans. The few anti-aircraft guns on taller buildings were unmanned or inoperative.

The first attack on 31 August 1943 targeted military objectives (city infrastructure, German troops, and equipment heading south) but resulted in a civilian massacre with limited damage to military targets. The death toll from this single raid, never precisely confirmed due to the authorities’ hasty retreat, ranges from 600 to 3,000. Most victims were elderly, women, and children. Targets hit included the police headquarters, post office, and Acerbo Institute, then a barracks for pilot trainees, where about fifty cadets died when a bomb struck their group returning from a march. Entire families gathered for lunch were wiped out. A paint factory was also hit, releasing a toxic cloud that made the air unbreathable in some areas.

The situation was worsened by the era’s disorganized civil protection system. The Italian Red Cross had only two ambulances and limited personnel, half of whom had been sent to Genoa and Naples to address bombings there. Volunteers from the UNPA were equipped only with gas masks, helmets, and axes, with minimal tools such as pickaxes, two bicycles, and a heavy handcart. Nonetheless, survivors’ efforts, often working with bare hands, prevented infections and epidemics. On September 3, the population was evacuated to restore water, electricity, and gas and conduct necessary disinfections. Unidentifiable human remains were piled and burned. Some bodies were found under rubble years later.

Ultimately, the bombings caused numerous deaths and nearly total destruction of the northern quadrant, the old Castellammare, with the sole strategic-military goal—destroying the railway station—unachieved, as only a few meters of track were damaged. The station was quickly restored, underscoring the minimal impact on the targeted infrastructure by the Allies.

Following the Armistice of Cassibile announcement on September 8, 1943, the city, like much of Italy, believed the war was over, leaving residents unprepared for subsequent events, with evacuees beginning to return.

Days after the armistice (and after witnessing the flight of Victor Emmanuel III to Pescara and Ortona), on September 12, Pescara was occupied without resistance by the German army, as the city was left undefended by remaining Italian authorities. It endured looting and destruction of port facilities, buildings, roads, bridges, and public offices by the occupiers, who mined the beach and surrounding areas. Numerous roundups targeted the population (engaged in the construction of fortifications), and a final evacuation was ordered by late September. The repression was severe, as evidenced by the events of 11 February 1944, commemorated by a plaque, where nine partisans were executed in an abandoned clay quarry in the Nature Reserve Pineta Dannunziana. Three other Pescara citizens, found with non-functional hunting rifles, were executed by Germans at Colle Orlando on 13 October 1943, also commemorated by a stele.

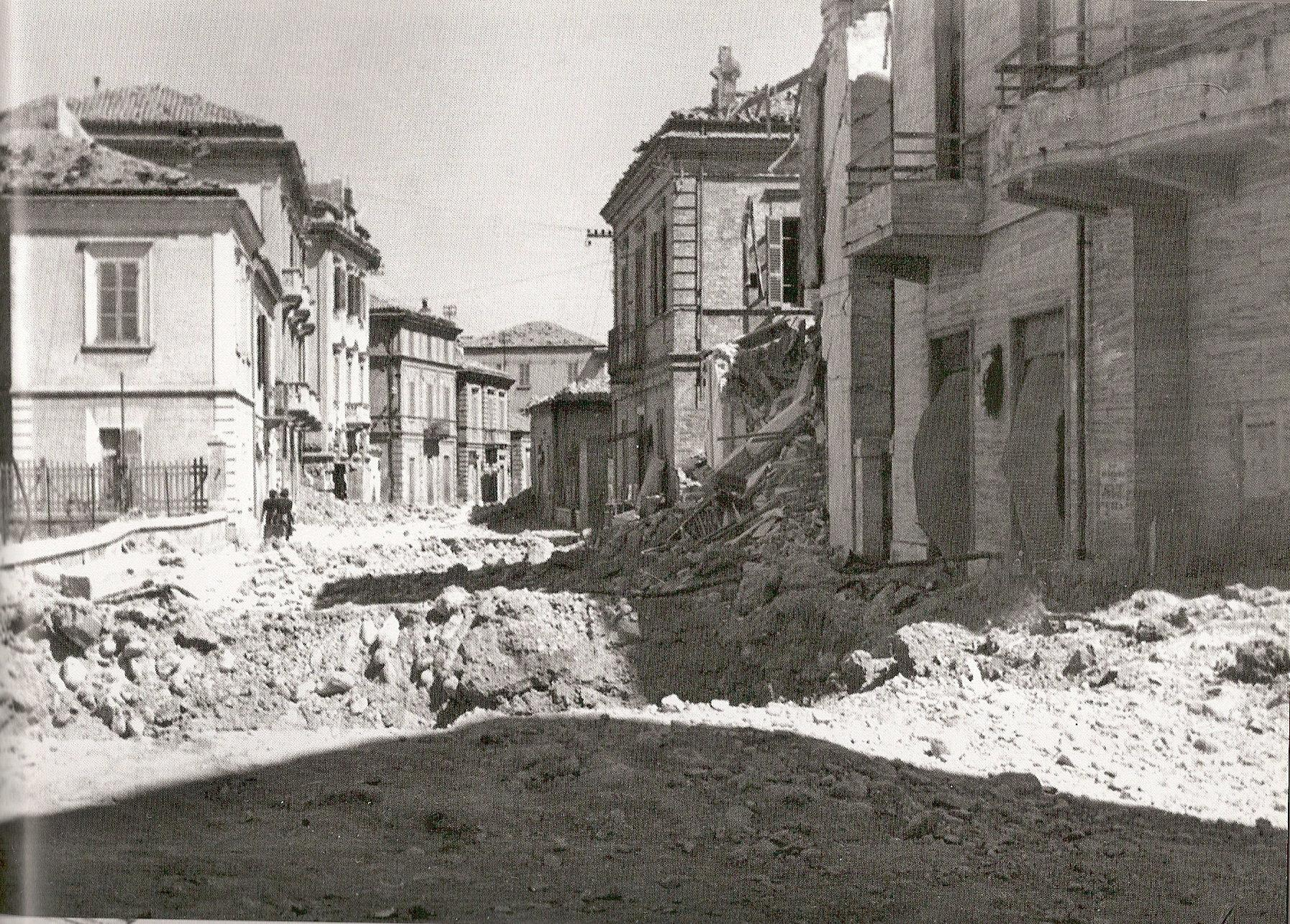
Rubble in Via Ravenna

On September 14, the city was heavily bombed again, hitting Portanuova, where the historic fortress district was struck, destroying the entire southern side of Via dei Bastioni, obliterating the 17th-century churches of San Giacomo and del Rosario, and the 16th-century city gate in the Bourbon Bath, later rebuilt as a modern entrance to the Museum of the Abruzzo People. The deadliest massacre occurred at the central station, where a starving crowd was looting a supply train headed south. Bombs falling nearby killed between 600 and 900 people within a few hundred meters. This raid, beyond the thousands of deaths, prompted most residents to flee again. Municipal offices, including the town hall, relocated to Spoltore, leaving Pescara a deserted city.

The evacuation limited casualties in subsequent raids on September 17, 19, and 20, which dropped a total of 165 tons of bombs. Another raid on October 4 targeted Portanuova with hundreds of bombs, killing sixteen civilians but missing a German group that had left hours earlier.

A further raid on October 17 hit the railway again, where Germans concentrated troops and equipment, injuring two civilians and killing dozens of Wehrmacht soldiers. Subsequent air raids decreased in severity, targeting only military objectives.

The final air raid occurred on December 8, conducted by numerous aircraft without specific targets. Due to the city’s depopulation, casualties were low. This was Pescara’s last air raid, with the city destroyed by 78%. The city, bombed for three and a half months, suffered between 2,000 and 9,000 deaths, with about 12,000 left homeless.

In early June 1944, retreating Germans abandoned Pescara, leaving a city 80% destroyed. Many city symbols vanished or were ruined, including the Littorio bridge’s statues, stolen before its destruction, the bells of the Sacro Cuore and San Cetteo churches, destined for bronze melting, and the municipal tower, demolished along with many other historic buildings to prevent enemy artillery from using them as reference points. During this period, the Gabriele d'Annunzio Birthplace Museum was ransacked by looters, who stole family valuables and plundered remaining valuables from destroyed palaces, shops, and banks in the former Liberty City.

On June 10, 1944, the Allies and CIL forces from Chieti and Francavilla liberated Pescara. They were assisted by the Nembo division of the 1st San Marco Regiment and two brigades of Indian troops from the British Indian Army.

During the war, several anti-fascist groups operated in the city. In 1940, former communist deputy Ettore Croce returned from French exile and, despite fascist police surveillance, gathered a small group of followers, including Mario Bellisario from Treglio, who formed anti-fascist cells in their hometowns and Pescara. Over fifty years after the war, President Carlo Azeglio Ciampi awarded Pescara the Gold Medal for Civil Merit:

Cities decorated for civil merit - ribbon for ordinary uniform

Cities decorated for civil merit
"A strategic hub on the route to northern Italy and for connections to the capital, during the last world war, it was the scene of continuous and devastating Allied air raids and suffered looting and destruction of buildings, roads, bridges, and public offices by the retreating German army. 31 August - 20 September 1943, Pescara."
— Pescara, 8 February 2001

=== Post-war period and population growth ===
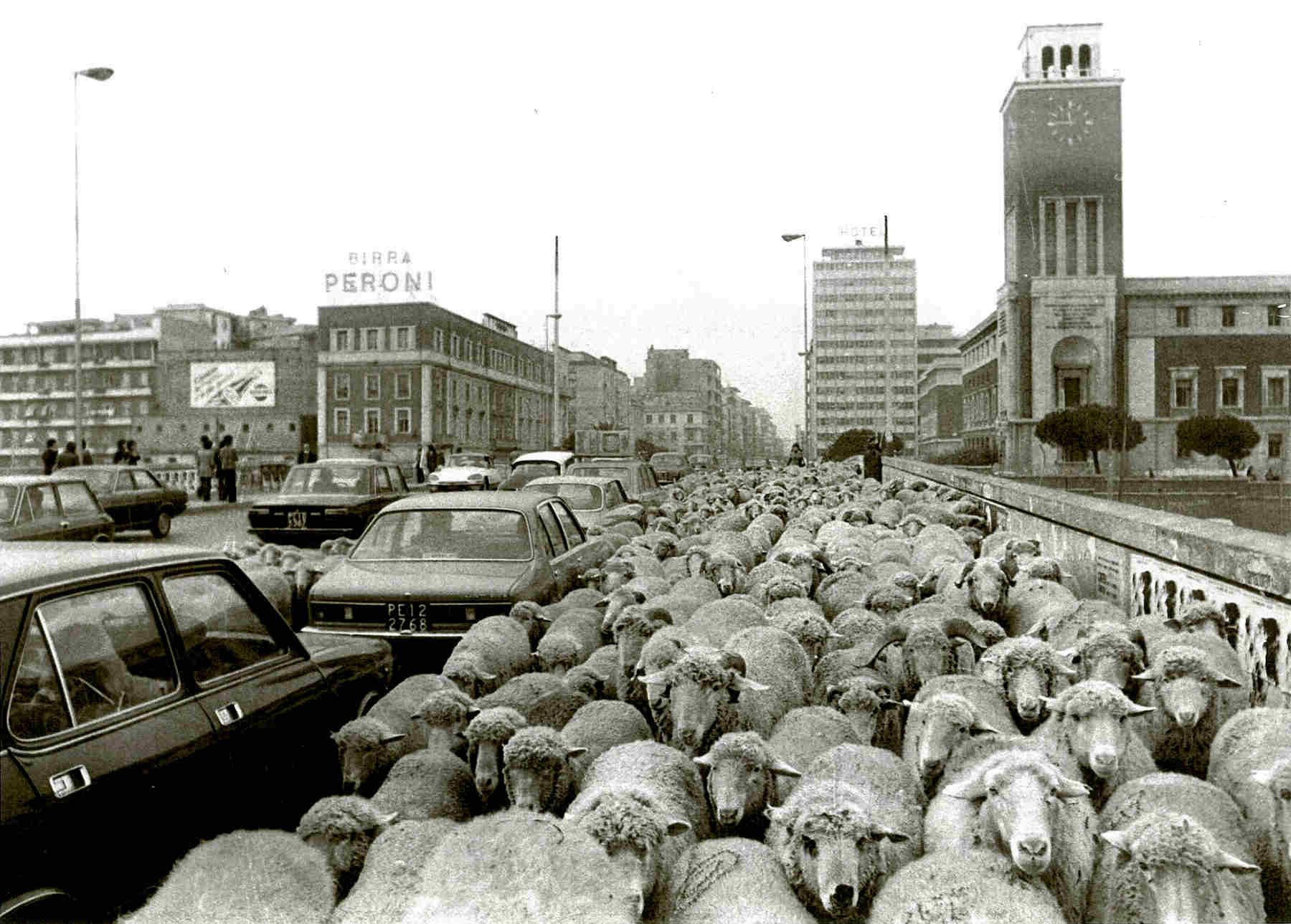
Risorgimento Bridge crossed by a flock of sheep in 1970

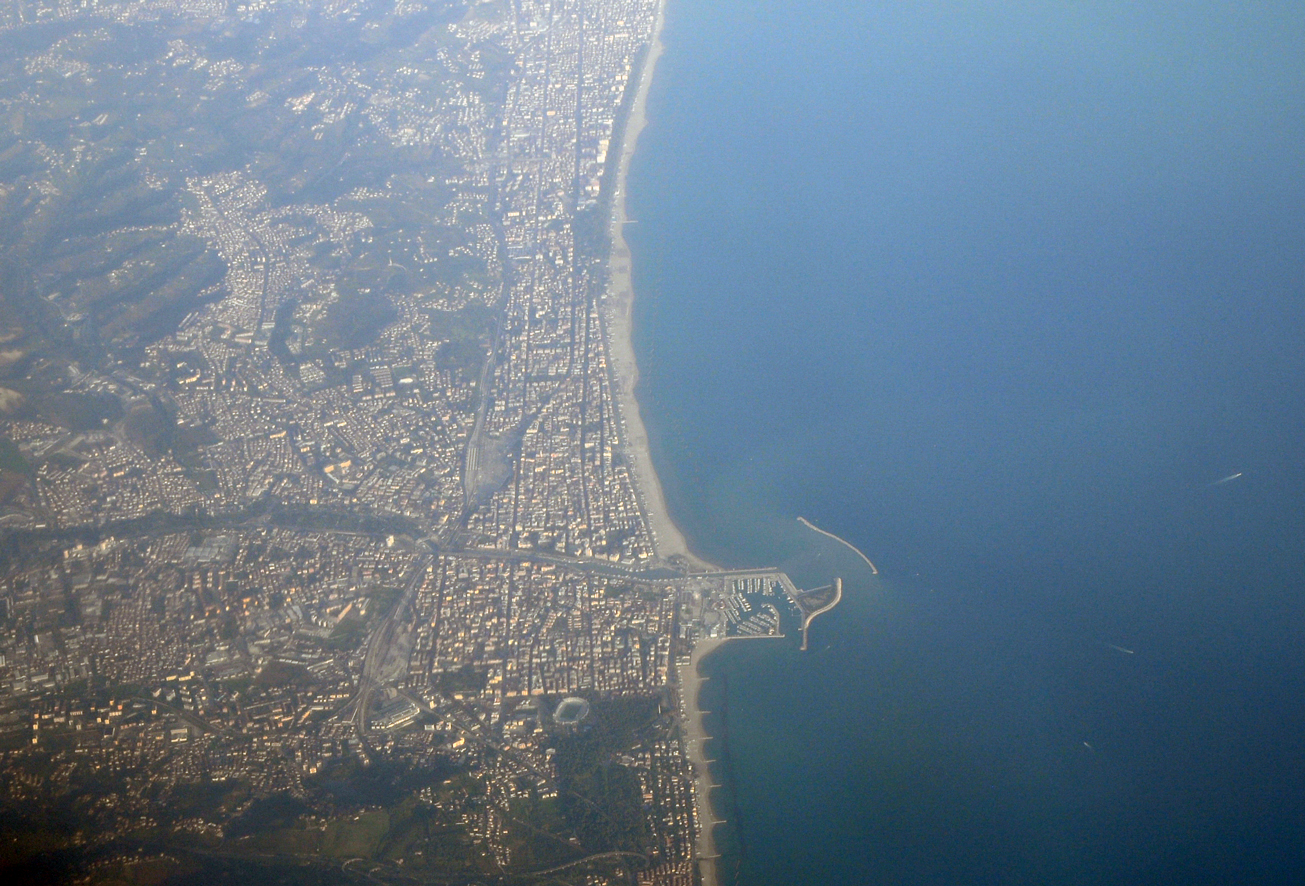
The city seen from above

After the war, Pescara's economic and social conditions were dire: economic activities were minimal, the city was largely in ruins, and thousands were homeless. Additionally, communication routes with the rest of the country were mostly damaged and difficult to navigate.

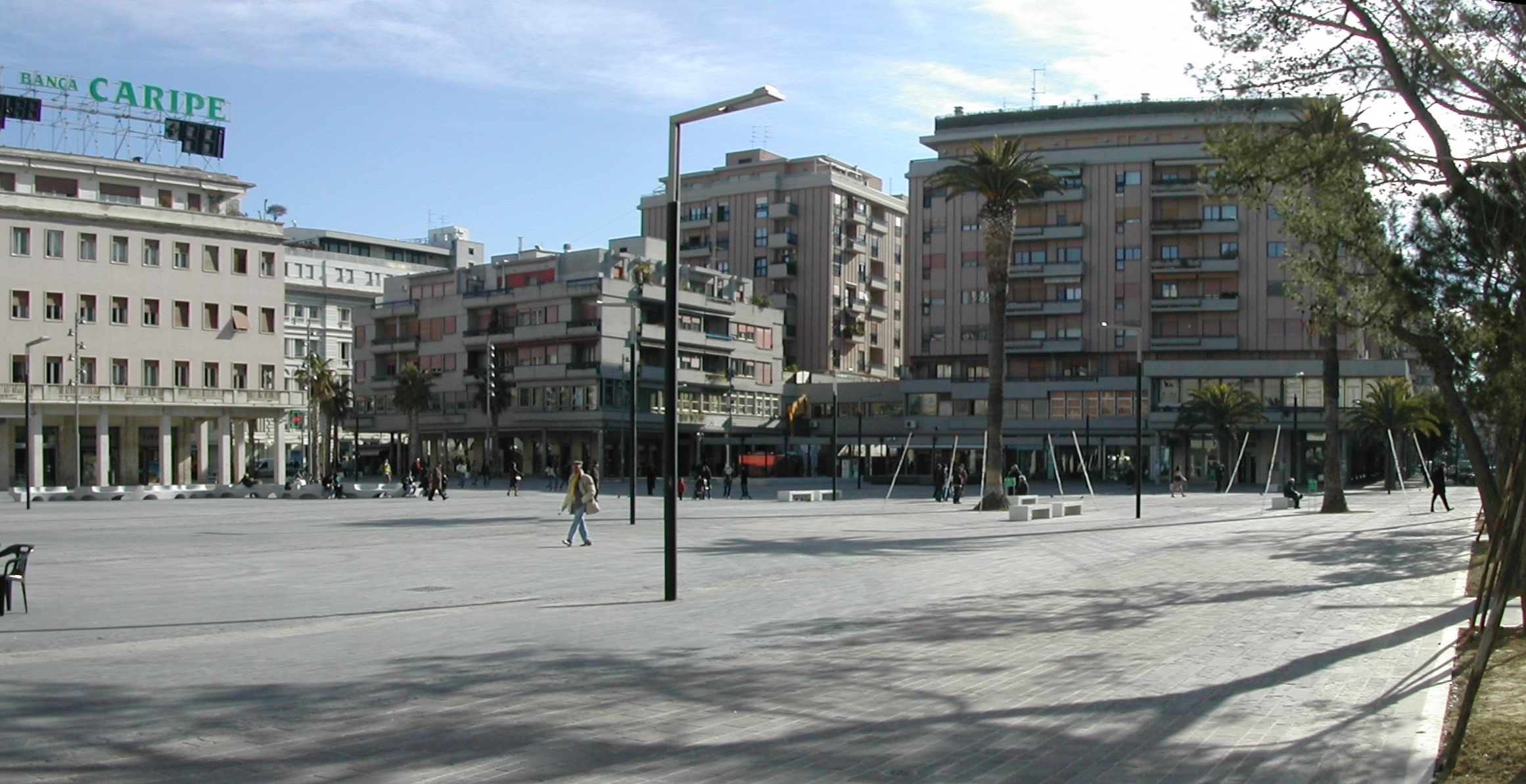
Piazza della Rinascita, known as Piazza Salotto, built after the 1943 bombings in an area of Corso Umberto I previously occupied by villas and buildings, quickly becoming the city's central square.

Within a few years, however, the rubble was cleared, and the most immediate basic needs were addressed as best as possible. The city began to grow again, fueled by a robust influx of new residents driven by the economic depression affecting inland Abruzzo and neighboring regions. Industrial reconstruction was swift, thanks to local entrepreneurship that funded rebuilding efforts while awaiting state contributions. By the 1950s, major industries were restored. By 1951, Pescara, at the heart of significant internal Abruzzese migration (which, though diminished over the decades, never ceased), had become the region's main hub, reaching 65,466 inhabitants. This growth expanded the urbanized area, heavily occupying the space between the railway and the sea, both northward and southward. The city grew primarily in height, without a clear plan, replacing historic buildings and villas with large condominiums, sacrificing green spaces and consequently congesting the city center. The center's layouts, designed decades before the war for much lower population densities, were unprepared for Italy's mass motorization. During this period, iconic city landmarks such as Piazza della Rinascita and the seafront took their final forms. The historic center, repeatedly affected by demolitions and often indiscriminate reconstructions since the late 19th century, underwent significant interventions during the postwar reconstruction. Although its layout still reflected its 16th-century origins, most buildings dated to the 18th and 19th centuries, with new postwar constructions surrounding the area; nothing predating these periods remained.

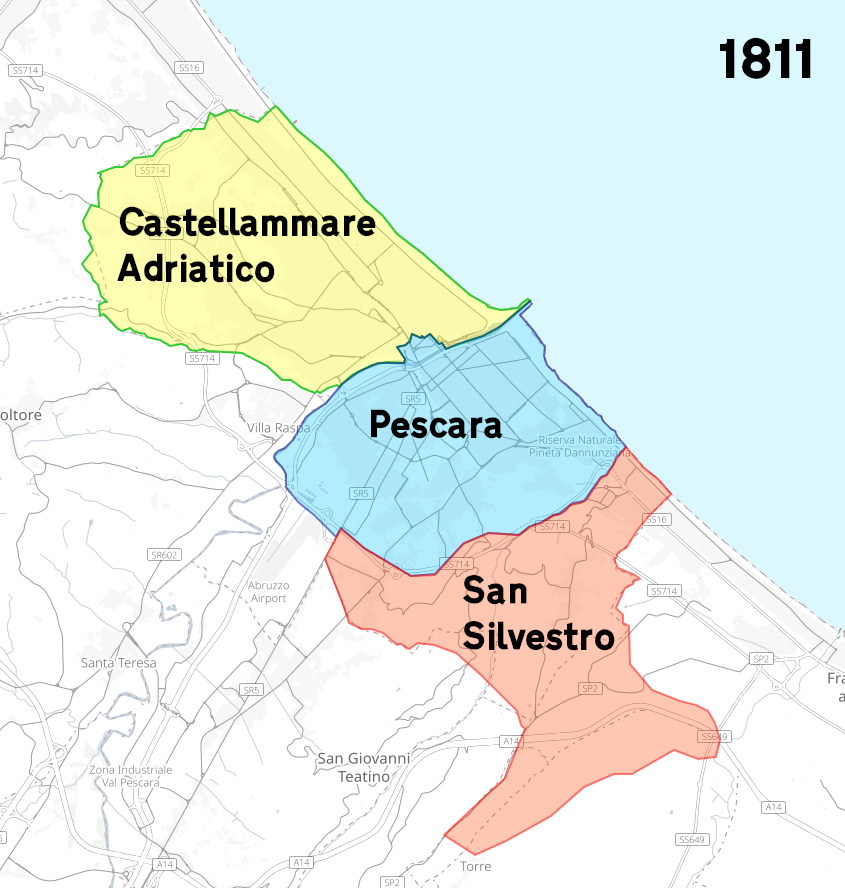
The three Pescara municipalities in 1811

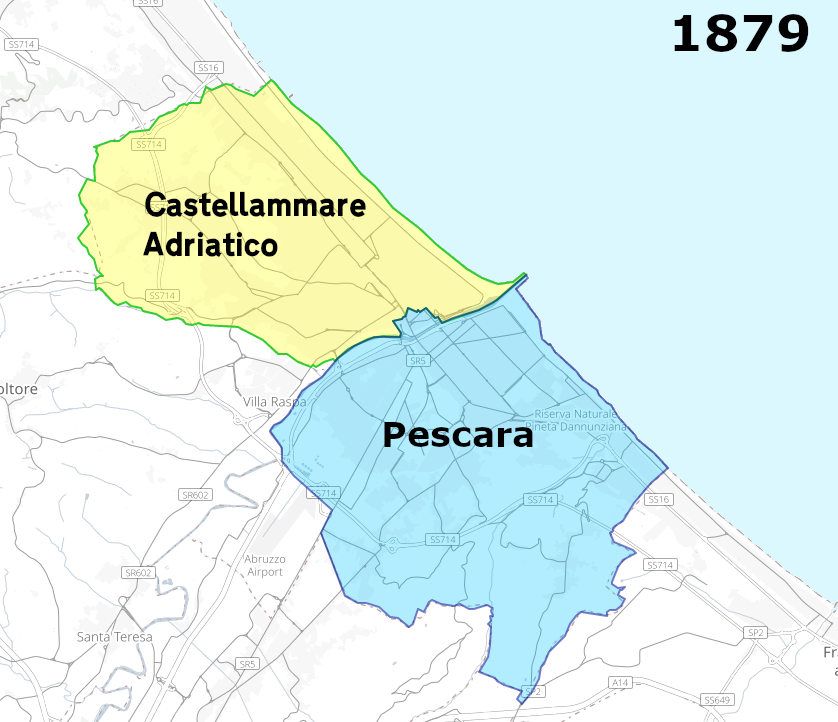
1879: San Silvestro becomes a hamlet of Pescara

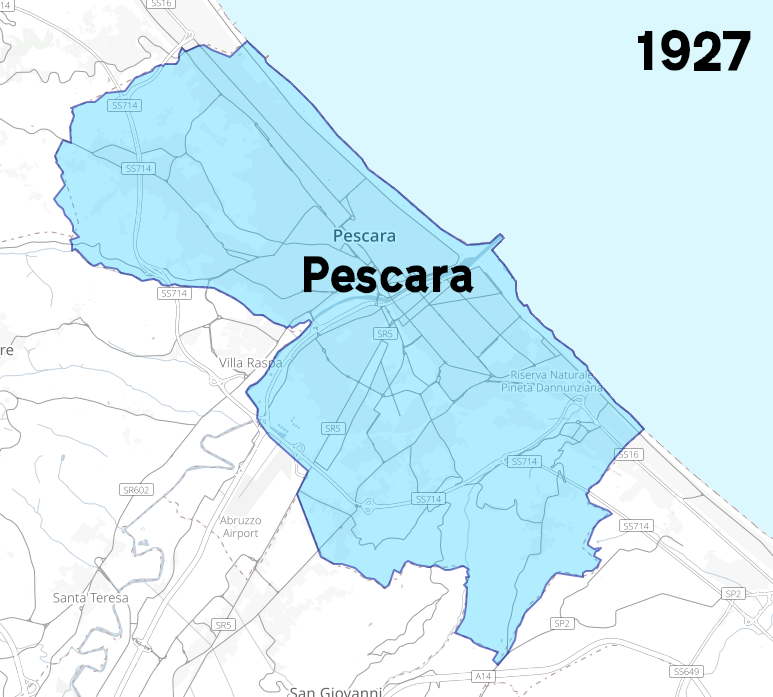
1927: Castellammare Adriatico is unified with Pescara

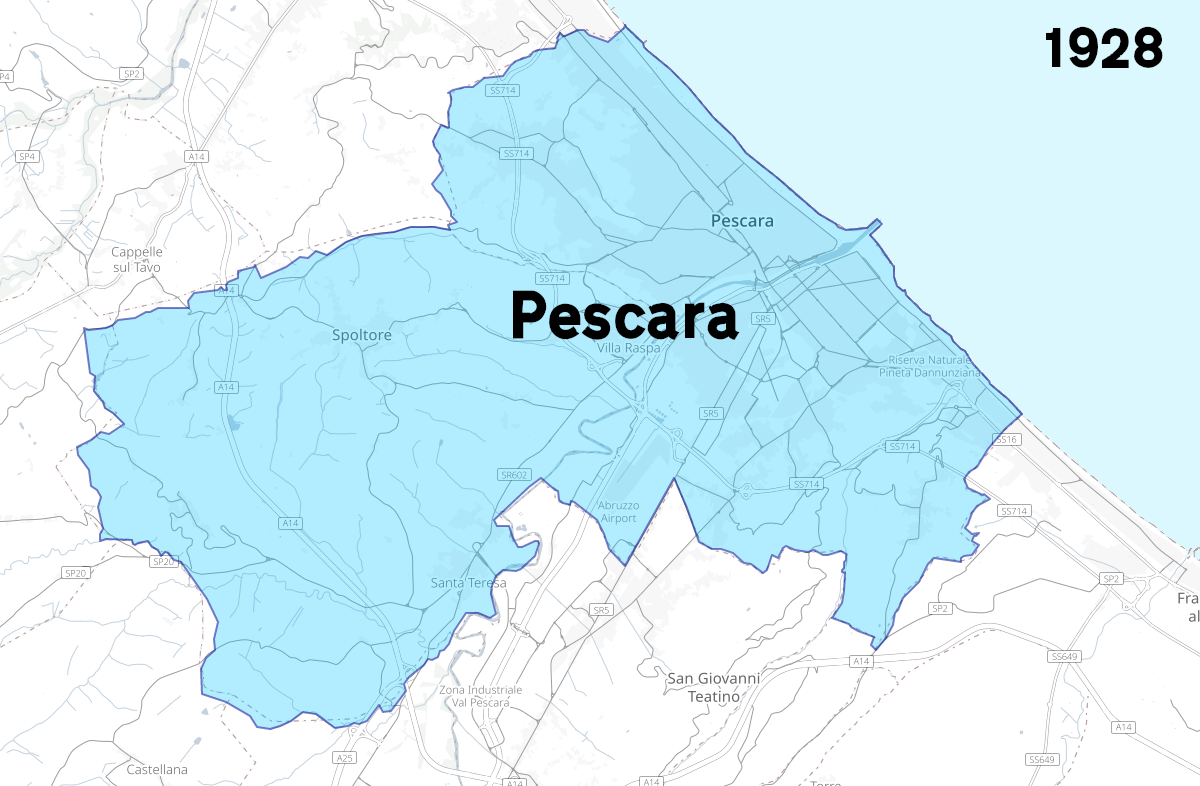
1928: Spoltore is unified with Pescara, which also acquires airport territories from San Giovanni Teatino

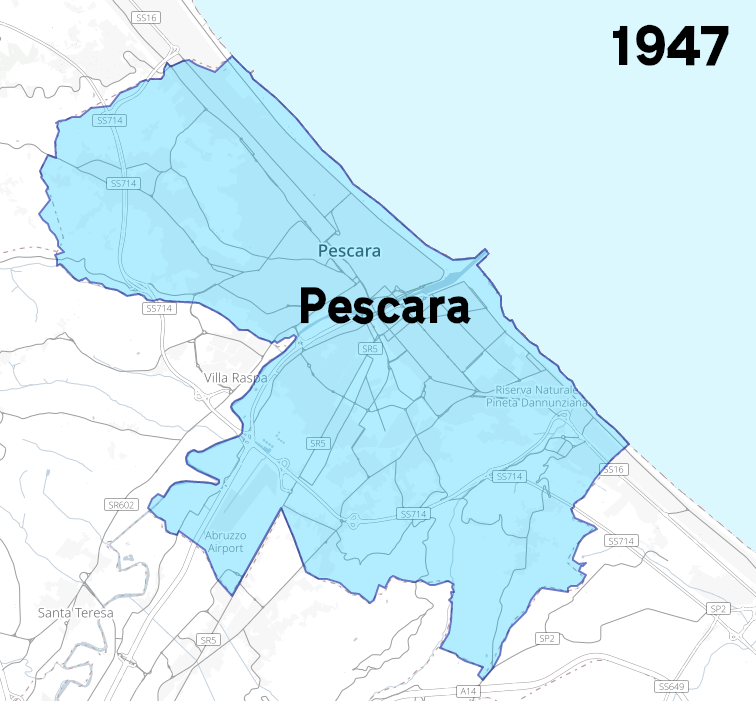
1947: Spoltore becomes an autonomous municipality again

Administrative History

Pescara's automotive tradition, historically represented by the Coppa Acerbo, was further solidified when the Mille Miglia included the Adriatic city in its itinerary from 1949 to 1957, culminating in the organization of the seventh race of the 1957 Formula 1 World Championship at the Pescara Circuit. In less than twenty years, from 1951 to 1971, the city doubled its population, reaching 122,470 residents, with a significant building boom, even by the already high Italian standards of the time.

Pescara has tripled its population in thirty years; the fishing nets along the port's docks remain a reminder of the Pescara that D’Annunzio saw as a disheveled tuft on the green Adriatic. Now the city reflects, in its canal and sea, ever-new factories and skyscrapers, in a frenzied and astonishing growth.

— L'Italia vista dal cielo - Abruzzo and Molise, by Folco Quilici and Ignazio Silone, 1970

In 1965, the D'Annunzio University of Chieti–Pescara was established, with campuses in Pescara, Teramo, and Chieti, consolidating the previous provincial university consortia into a single entity. The construction of the new Pescara Centrale railway station, inaugurated on 31 January 1988, was a significant event for the city's development. The opening of the new station was particularly relevant from an urban planning perspective, as the entire railway line was relocated to an elevated track further back toward the hills, eliminating numerous level crossings. The decommissioned railway track was converted into a green corridor known locally as Strada parco, served by the Pescara trolleybus running on its own dedicated route. In 1967, the Ente Manifestazioni Pescaresi, a cultural organization established in the 1950s to revive the city's cultural life, launched the Pescara Jazz festival, Italy's first summer jazz festival, which over the years became a national and international reference for the genre. Following the establishment of the Abruzzo regional authority in 1971, which designated L'Aquila as the regional capital, it was decided politically to also locate the seats of the regional council and regional government in Pescara, creating dual seats for these bodies. During heated negotiations, it was decided to place most of the regional departments in Pescara.

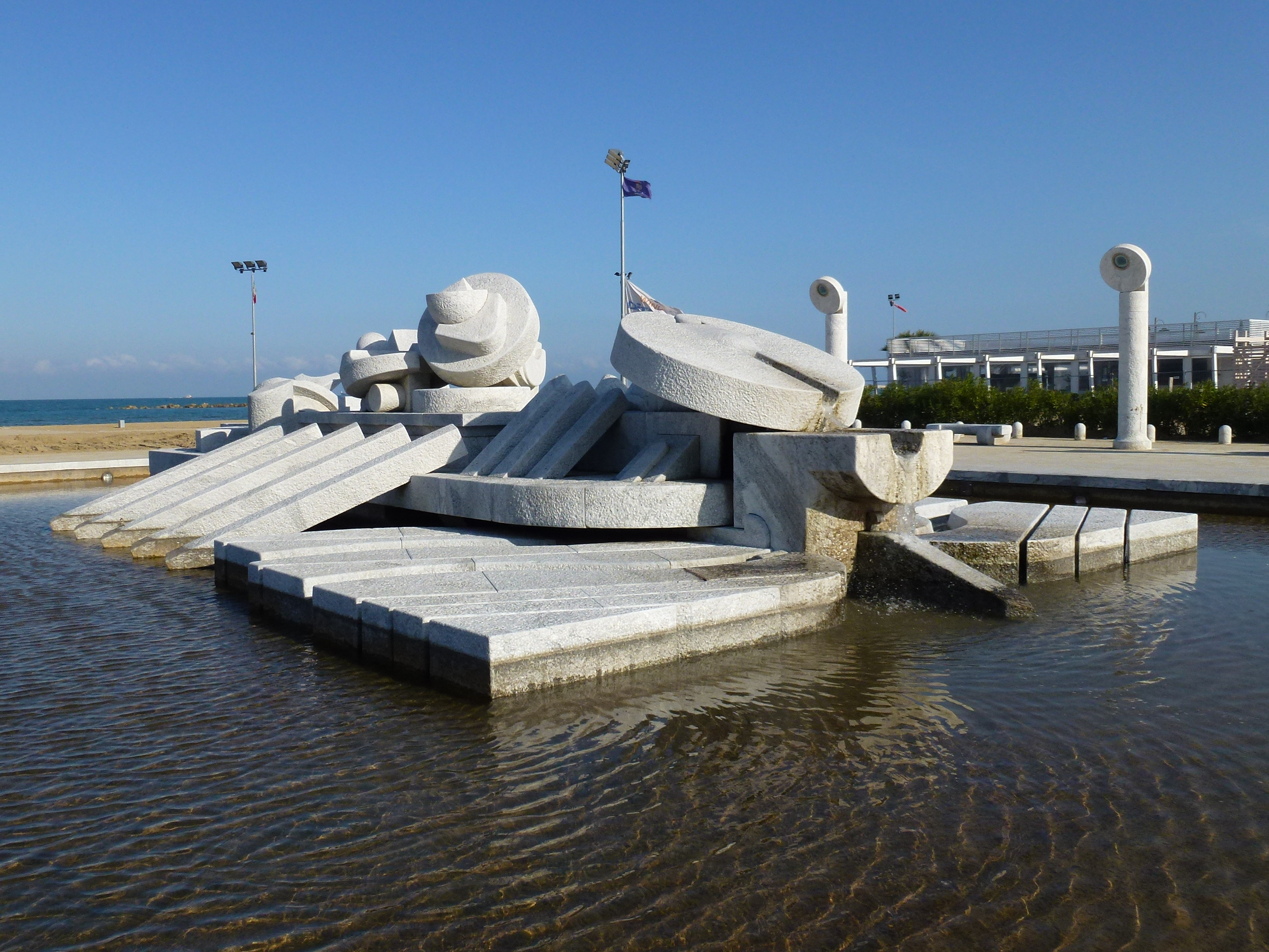
The "Nave" fountain by Pietro Cascella, placed in 1987 in Largo Mediterraneo where the 1927 war memorial by Ortona sculptor Guido Costanzo stood until 1943

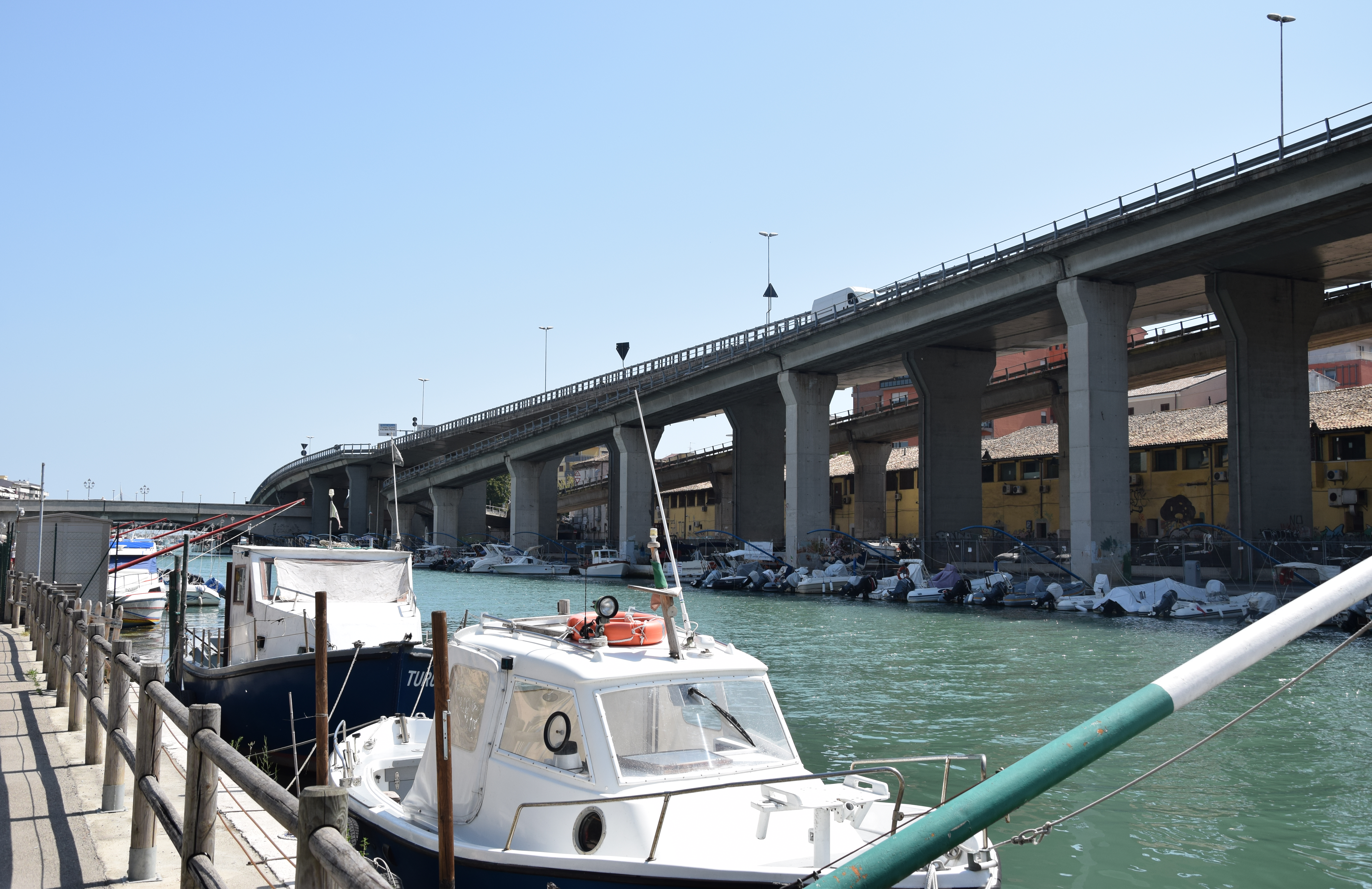
The SS 16 dir/C overlooking the Bourbon prison

=== From the First to the Second Republic ===
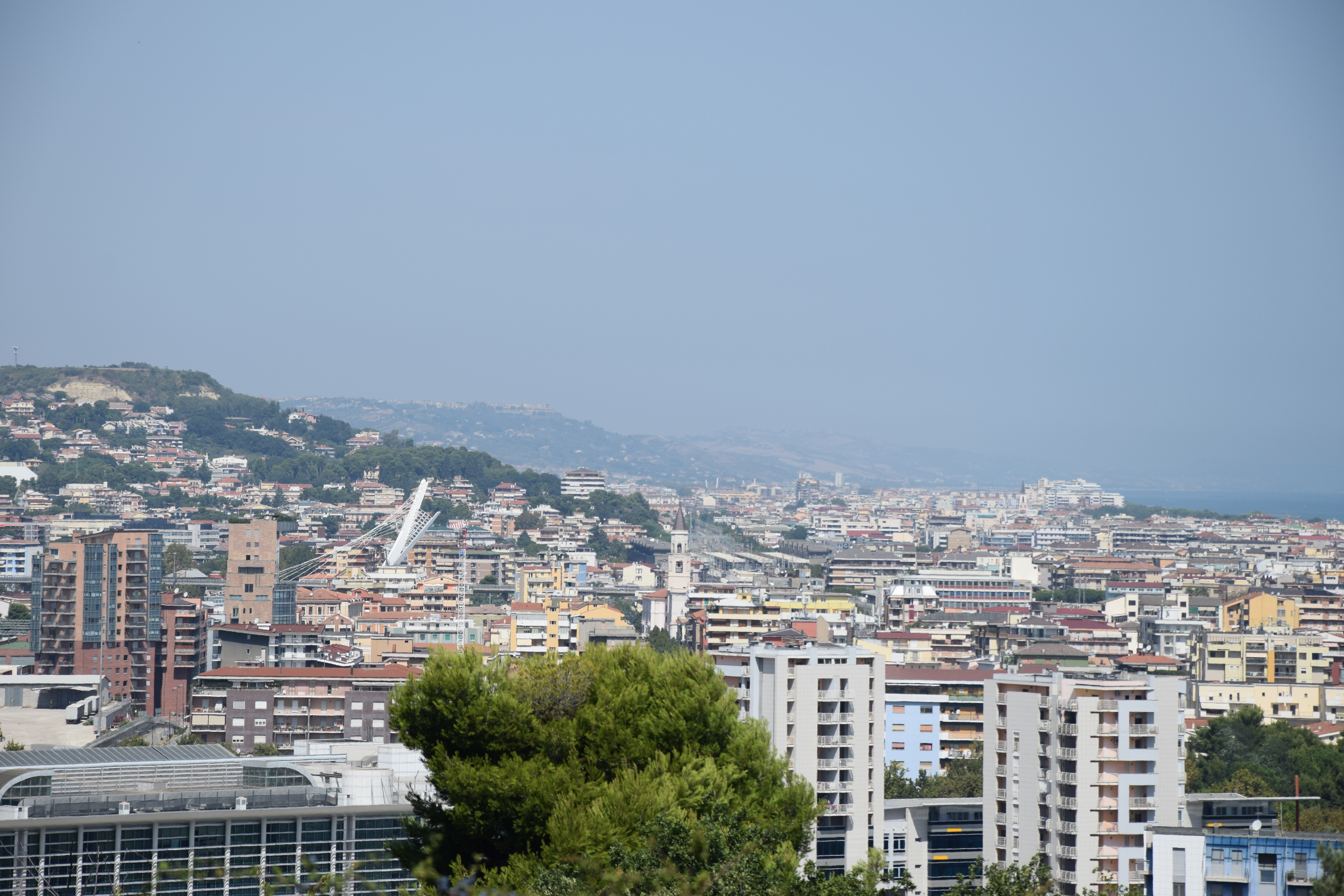
View of the city from Colle Falcone

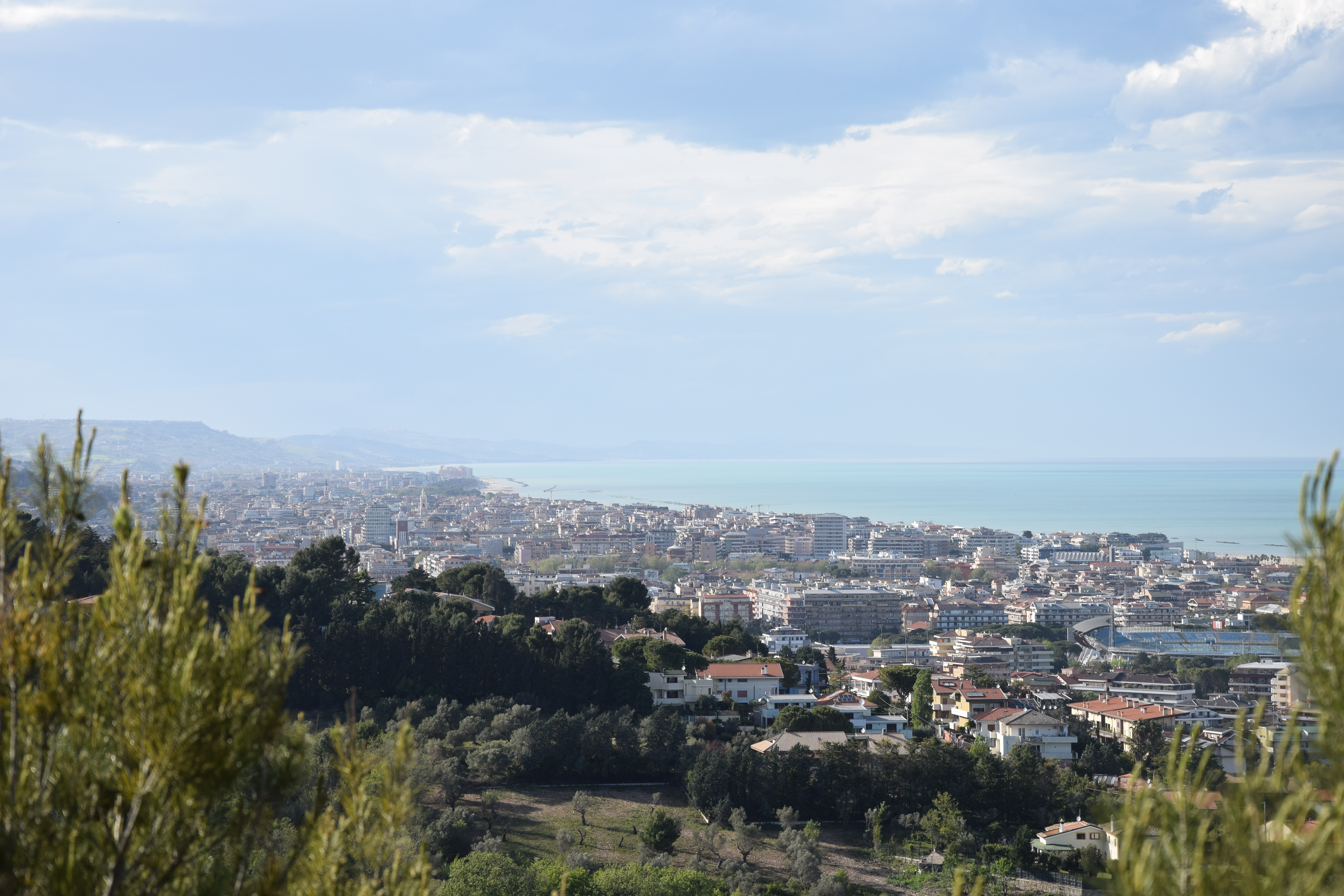
Panoramic view of the city from San Silvestro

Administratively, after the initial postwar reconstruction led by left-wing administrations under Italo Giovannucci and Vincenzo Chiola (backed by PCI-PSI majorities), from the 1956 elections, the city was continuously governed by the Christian Democracy and its allies until 1993. These administrations, however, were responsible for controversial urban planning decisions, including the construction of the elevated dual carriageway in 1978 along the southern riverfront near the historic center, the demolition of surviving buildings on the southern side of Corso Umberto I (and other city areas) in the 1960s, their replacement with condominiums, and the 1963 demolition of the Teatro Pomponi on the seafront. The Teatro Pomponi had already replaced the 1887 Padiglione Marino, the city's first bathing establishment and Castellammare's Kursaal, in 1923. Its demolition was carried out to prevent the necessity of a costly restoration. The theater's demolition was already planned in Luigi Piccinato's 1947 reconstruction plans, which were often largely ignored, to make way for a Riviera park that was never realized. In 1963, the Pescara-Penne railway also ceased operations, replaced by a bus service that, over decades under prolonged government management until 2001, expanded across the province and region, eventually merging into the TUA in 2015. In 1979, the city recorded its highest-ever population of 137,059 residents. From then on, the city began losing residents to its surrounding metropolitan area, stabilizing at around 120,000 inhabitants. In 1988, many members of the municipal council led by Mayor Nevio Piscione (DC), including the mayor himself, were found guilty and convicted of abuse of office related to municipal employee appointments. A series of investigations in 1993, during the period when Italian politics was shaken by the Mani pulite inquiries, led to the arrest and conviction of numerous regional and municipal officials for various corruption-related crimes in public contract management. This included the arrest of Mayor Giuseppe Ciccantelli (DC) and local Christian Democracy and Socialist Party leaders in April for irregularities in the waste disposal service contract. The murder in the city, under circumstances never fully clarified, of lawyer Fabrizio Fabrizi on 6 October 1991 was also attributed to the political-criminal environment under investigation and to attempts by Campanian organized crime to infiltrate the region. The climate of deep distrust in the political class and ongoing investigations into public administrators led Christian Democrat councilor Valterio Cirillo, investigated but later acquitted, to take his own life on 13 April 1993 by jumping from the sixth floor of his residence. Another investigation involved Remo Gaspari, a prominent Abruzzese Christian Democrat, for using Fire Brigade helicopters for personal purposes. Further investigations led to the arrest of local RAI officials and former councilor Fernando Di Benedetto in October 1993 for fraudulent misrepresentation, abuse of office for financial gain, and fraud against the public broadcaster in connection with the construction of a new regional headquarters in the city.

The November 1993 elections, immediately following the Mani pulite events, marked the fall of the First Republic and were the first in which mayors were directly elected by citizens. The Progressives coalition, led by independent leftist Mario Collevecchio, defeated the DC-PSI-inspired civic list. However, after a brief governing period, the elections were annulled due to a procedural error in the list submission. In the subsequent November 1994 elections, the center-right coalition led by Mayor Carlo Pace (AN) was elected, governing the city for two terms until 2003. During this period, the city experienced its first phase of urban transformation with the approval of a new urban plan, the creation of new museum spaces, and the establishment of the Nature Reserve Pineta Dannunziana in 2000.

=== The new millennium ===
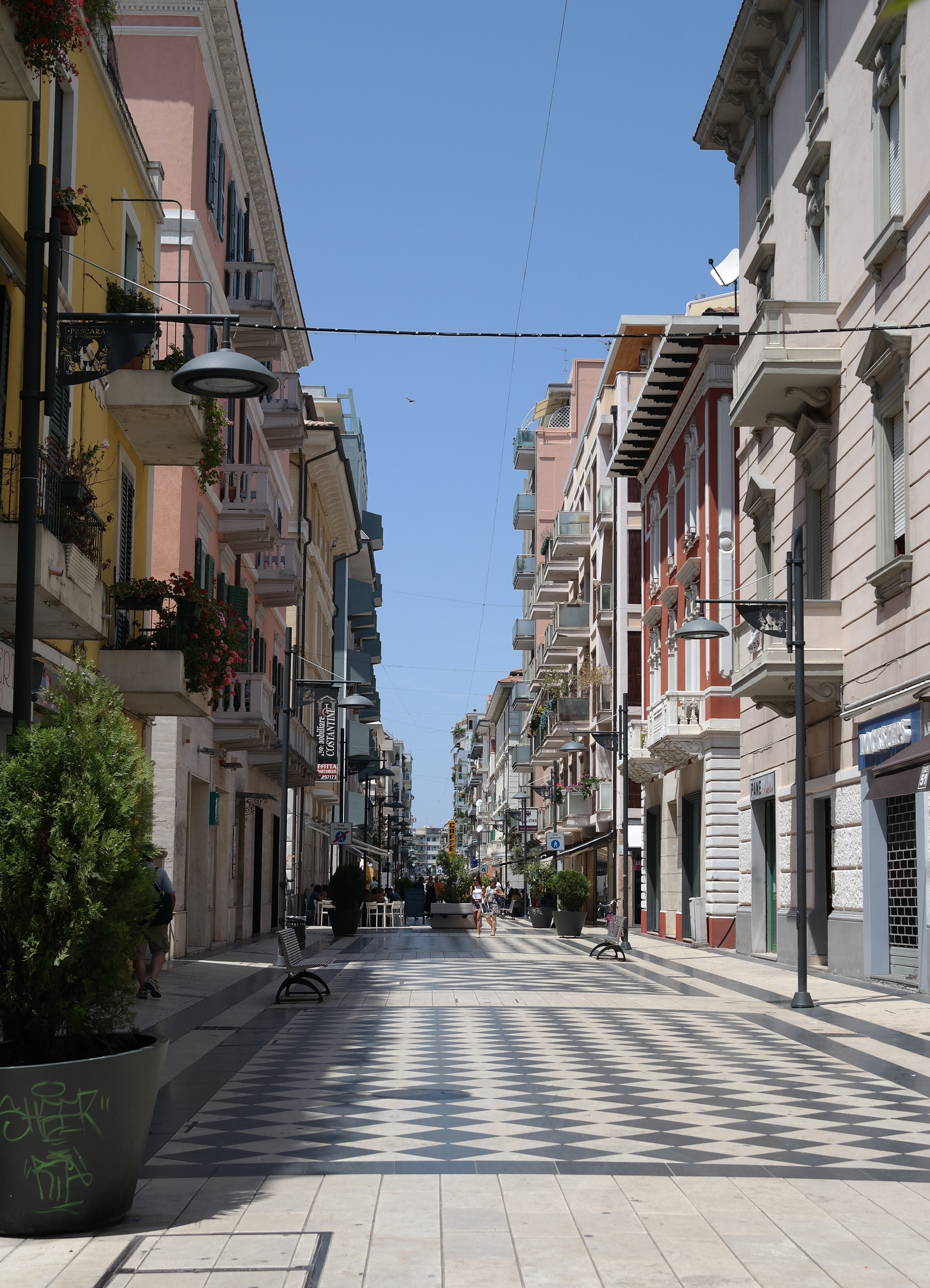
Via Firenze, a cardo of the city center, after the 2011 redevelopment

The center-left administration of Mayor Luciano D'Alfonso (L'Ulivo), elected in the May 2003 elections and reconfirmed in the April 2008 elections, initiated a revival of the city's urban layout, restoring the use of abandoned historic areas and buildings such as the former Cocco barracks (converted into a public park) and the former Aurum factory. It implemented numerous projects, including extending the pedestrianization of central areas, building on the previous administration's efforts, and creating a network of cycle paths. Major projects included the Sea Bridge and initiating preliminary projects for the Flaiano Bridge, which impacted the city's appearance and quality of life. The administration's second term was short-lived due to a series of charges against D'Alfonso regarding alleged bribery activities between entrepreneurs and the municipality. D'Alfonso and all other defendants were later acquitted, as the facts were not substantiated.

In the subsequent 2009 elections, the center-right coalition led by Mayor Luigi Albore Mascia (PdL) was elected. That same year, the city hosted the XVI Mediterranean Games, and in January 2010, the new Pescara Porta Nuova railway station was inaugurated. The Albore Mascia administration was later accused by the State General Accounting Office of leading the municipality into a state of pre-bankruptcy, resulting in a debt exceeding 50 million euros. In the 2014 elections, the center-left coalition led by Mayor Marco Alessandrini (PD) returned to power, and its administration successfully restored the municipality's finances. Declining a second term, in the 2019 elections, Carlo Masci (FI), leading a center-right coalition, was elected mayor.

=== Metropolitan area ===
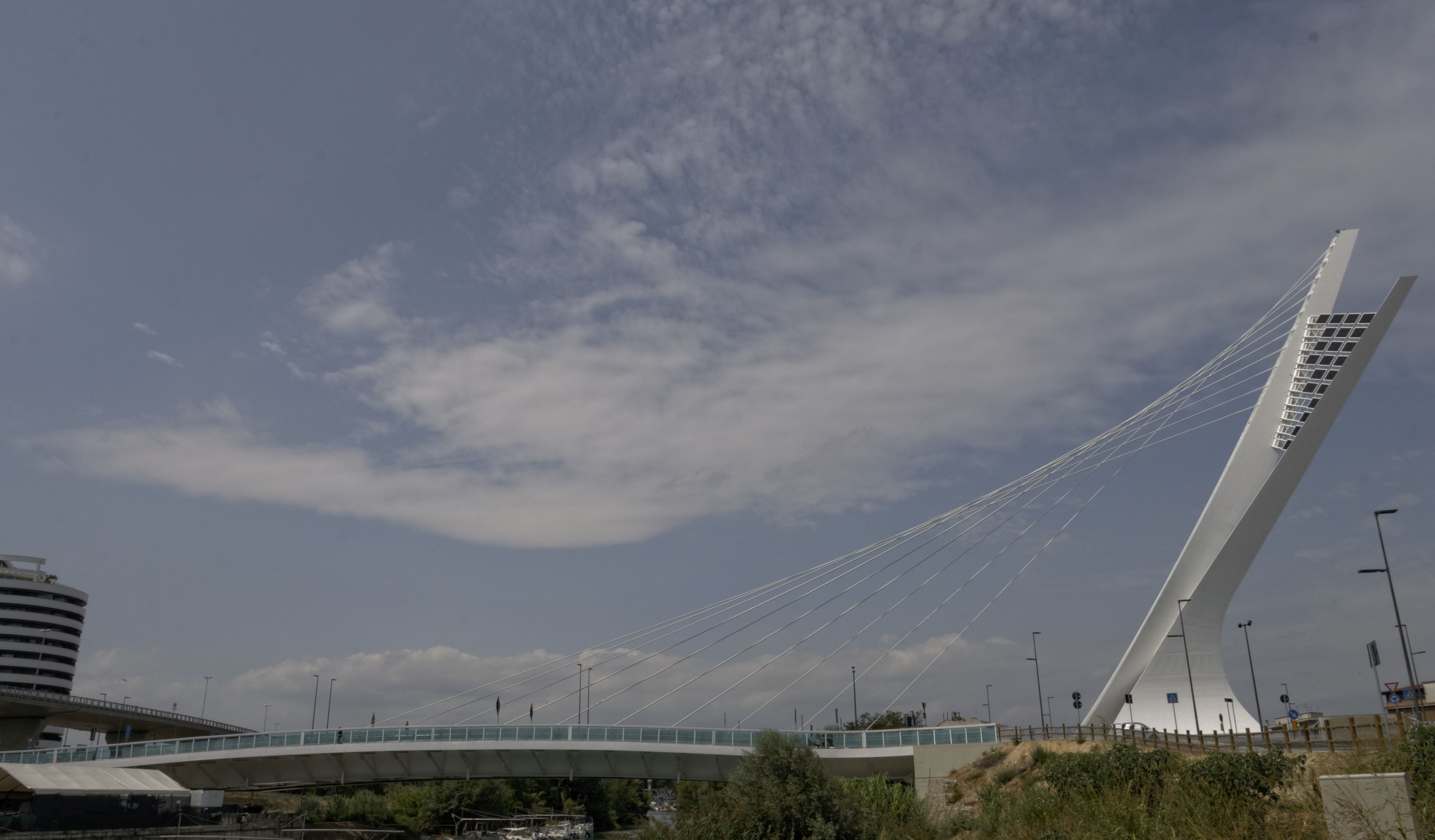
Flaiano Bridge, inaugurated in 2017

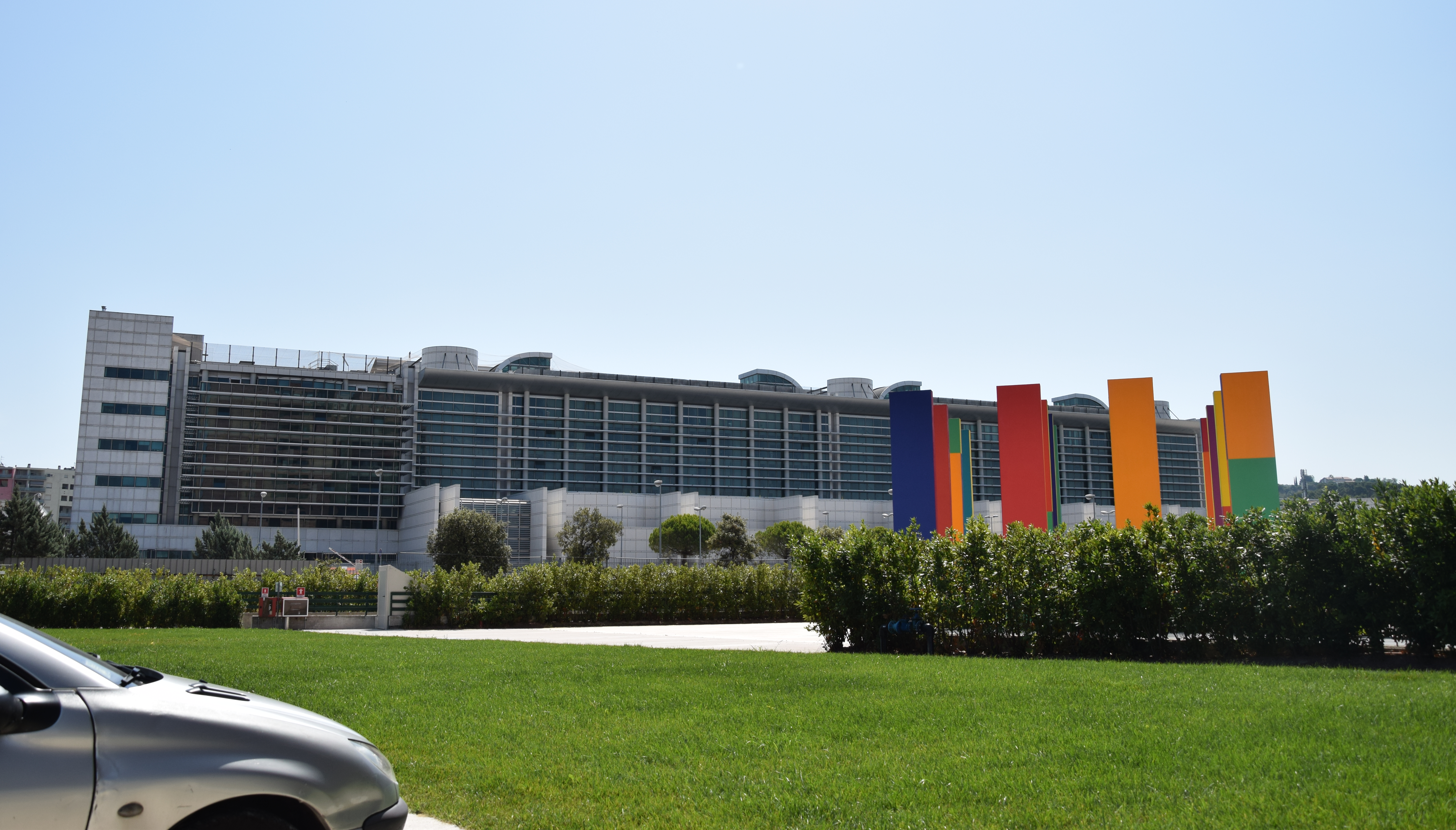
The 2004 Palace of Justice

Following the rapid saturation of the small municipal territory of 33.95 km² reached in the 1970s (with a density as of 31 December 2019 of 3,528.72 inhabitants/km², making Pescara one of Italy's densest provincial capitals, surpassed only by major metropolises), the city continued to expand beyond its borders into neighboring municipalities (notably Montesilvano, Città Sant'Angelo, Spoltore, Francavilla al Mare, and San Giovanni Teatino). Since the 1980s, Pescara, alongside Chieti, has been at the center of an increasingly integrated and interdependent metropolitan area, supported and connected by the ring road system of the SS 714 and Raccordo autostradale RA12. However, this area has not been designated by lawmakers as one of Italy's metropolitan cities, and within their legislative constraints, local administrations have sought to support its development, both in terms of urban planning by building appropriate mobility infrastructure (such as new junctions and ring road extensions in neighboring municipalities), and through territorial and local public transport planning with a metropolitan perspective.

From above, this area takes the shape of a "T": from the valley starting at the foot of Chieti, it extends toward the sea and spreads its wings along the coast, north toward Montesilvano and south toward Francavilla al Mare. It includes the municipalities of Pescara, Montesilvano, Francavilla al Mare, Silvi, Città Sant'Angelo, Chieti, Spoltore, Cappelle sul Tavo, and San Giovanni Teatino, with approximately 350,000 inhabitants, roughly a quarter of the region's total population.

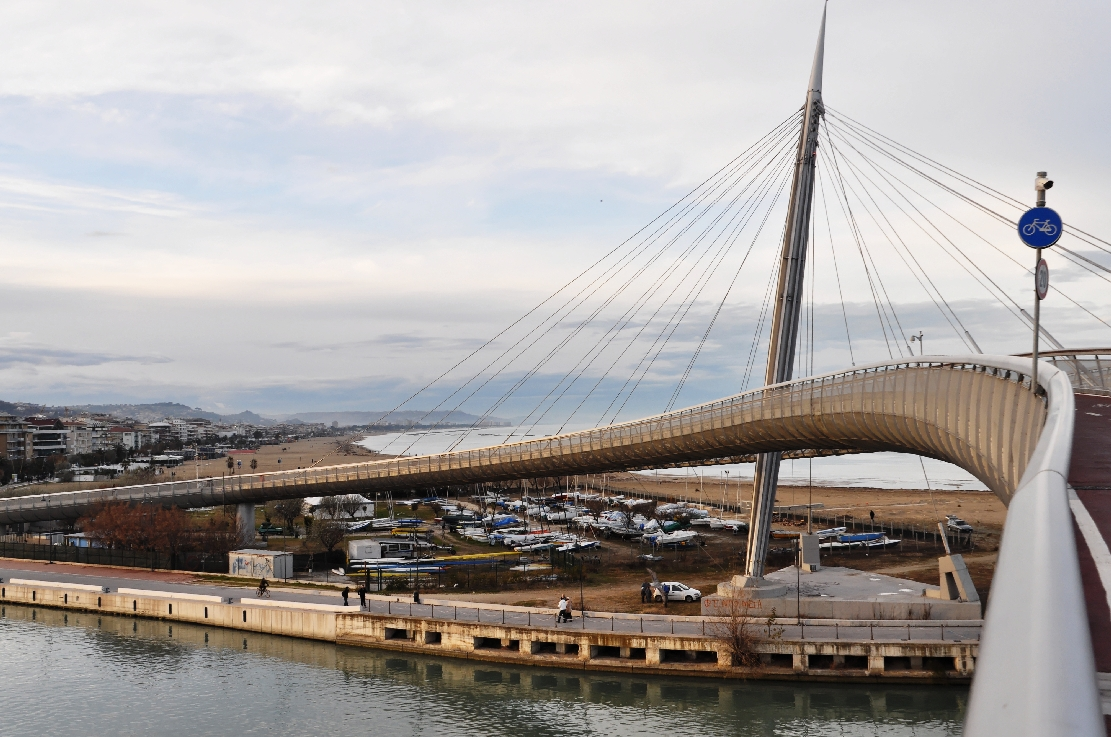
Ponte del Mare, inaugurated in 2009

=== New Pescara ===
On 25 May 2014, residents of Pescara, Montesilvano, and Spoltore voted in a referendum in favor of establishing a single municipality. A total of 69.46% of eligible voters participated, with 64% voting in favor of the merger: 70.32% in Pescara, 52.23% in Montesilvano, and 51.15% in Spoltore. The relevant regional law was approved on 8 August 2018, setting 1 January 2022 as the establishment date for the new municipality. The deadline was initially postponed to 1 January 2023, and later to 2027

| Municipalities involved | Residents as of 31-12-1971 | Residents as of 31-12-1981 | Residents as of 31-12-1991 | Residents as of 31-12-2001 | Residents as of 31-12-2011 | Residents as of 31-12-2021 | Residents as of 31-12-2024 | Area (km²) | Density as of 31-12-2024 (inh./km²) |
|---|---|---|---|---|---|---|---|---|---|
| Pescara | 122,470 | 131,330 | 122,236 | 116,286 | 117,166 | 119,406 | 118,419 | 33.949 | 3,488.14 |
| Montesilvano | 18,265 | 29,240 | 35,153 | 40,700 | 50,413 | 53,174 | 53,556 | 23.5746 | 2,271.76 |
| Spoltore | 8,560 | 10,552 | 12,930 | 15,417 | 18,566 | 18,909 | 18,997 | 37.0144 | 513.23 |
| Nuova Pescara | 149,295 | 171,112 | 170,319 | 172,403 | 186,145 | 191,489 | 190,972 | 94.538 | 2,020.05 |

== See also ==
- Pescara
- Aternum
- Castellammare Adriatico
- Bombing of Pescara in World War II

== Bibliography ==
Sources used

- Livy (1989) [14]. "Books VIII-IX-X-XXIV". In Scàndola, Mario (ed.). Ab Urbe Condita Libri. Latin text with facing translation. Classici greci e latini (in Latin). Vol. 4. Milan: Rizzoli.
- Strabo (1993) [14-23]. Biraschi, Anna Maria (ed.). Geography. Italy (PDF). Milan: Rizzoli.
- Appian (1879) [c. 160]. "Book I". Roman History. Bibliotheca Teubneriana. Vol. II. Leipzig: Edizioni Teubner.
- Paul the Deacon (1991) [789]. "Book II". In Zanella, Antonio (ed.). History of the Lombards. Latin text with facing translation (in Latin). Milan: Rizzoli.
- Guicciardini, Francesco (1971) [1561]. Seidel Menchi, Silvana (ed.). History of Italy. Vol. XIX–IV. Turin: Giulio Einaudi Editore.
- Costo, Tommaso (1588). "Book I". Supplement of Three Books by Tommaso Costo to the History of the Kingdom of Naples. Venice.
- Tria, Giovanni Andrea (1744). Historical, Civil, and Ecclesiastical Memoirs of the City and Diocese of Larino, Metropolis of the Ancient Frentani (PDF). Rome: Stamperia Giovanni Zempel.
- Antinori, Anton Ludovico (2013) [1784]. Zuccarini, Chiara (ed.). Annals of the Abruzzi. Vol. IV part II, VI parts II-III. Milan: Simonelli editore.
- Petromasi, Domenico (1801). History of the Expedition of the Most Eminent Cardinal Fabrizio Ruffo. Naples: Vincenzo Manfredi editore.
- Bulletin of the Laws of the Kingdom of Naples, Year 1806. Naples: Fonderia Reale e stamperia della segreteria di Stato. 1813.
- Bulletin of the Laws of the Kingdom of Naples, Year 1811. Naples: Fonderia Reale e stamperia della segreteria di Stato. 1813.
- Romanelli, Domenico (1996) [1819]. "Aternum Oppidum". In Polla, Adelmo (ed.). History of the Frentani. Istonio, Anxano, Ortona, and Other Ancient Cities Lost in the Dark Ages (PDF). I tascabili d'Abruzzo. Cerchio: Polla editore. Archived from the original (PDF) on March 28, 2019.
- Botta, Carlo (1824). History of Italy from 1789 to 1814. Vol. V. Mendrisio: Tipografia Elvetica.
- Zuccagni-Orlandini, Attilio (1844). Physical, Historical, and Statistical Chorography of Italy and Its Islands, Accompanied by an Atlas of Geographical and Topographical Maps and Other Illustrative Plates. Vol. XI Kingdom of the Two Sicilies - Domains on This Side of the Lighthouse. Florence: Gli Editori. p. 982.
- Vannucci, Atto (1872). Martyrs of Italian Freedom from 1794 to 1848. Biblioteca utile (V ed.). Milan: Fratelli Treves.
- Finlay, George (1907). Greece Under the Romans (PDF). Boston: E. P. Dutton.
- Farina, Francesco (1910). Memories of Pescara in the Year 1860 on the Occasion of the Fiftieth Anniversary. Pescara: Fratelli La Galla.
- Coppa Zuccari, Luigi (December 1919). "Biographical Notes on the Bandit Leader Giuseppe Pronio of Introdacqua (1760-1804)". La rivista abruzzese di scienze, lettere ed arti (12). Teramo: Tipografia del Corriere abruzzese.
- Devoto, Giacomo (1977) [1931]. The Ancient Italians (V ed.). Florence: Vallecchi.
- Catalano, Antonio (1977). "The "University Question" and Its Reflections in Abruzzo". Itinerari. 16 (2).
- Bompiani, Adriano (1979). "University and the South". Oggi e Domani. 7 (5).
- Colapietra, Raffaele (1980). Pescara 1860 - 1960. Pescara: Costantini editore.
- Sgattoni, Marcello; Zanni, Pino Ulisse, eds. (September 1983). Cerrano Yesterday and Today. Teramo: Amministrazione provinciale di Teramo.
- Lopez, Luigi (1985). Pescara from Vestina Aterno to 1815. L'Aquila: Deputazione abruzzese di storia patria.
- SABAP-Abr (1988). Pescara and D'Annunzian Memories. D'Annunzian Places. Pescara: Soprintendenza archeologia, belle arti e paesaggio dell'Abruzzo.
- Staffa, Andrea (1991). "Excavations in the Historic Center of Pescara, 1: First Elements for a Reconstruction of the Ancient and Early Medieval Layout of the Settlement of "Ostia Aterni-Aternum"". Medieval Archaeology (PDF). Vol. XVIII. Florence: All'insegna del giglio.
- Staffa, Andrea (1992). "Abruzzo Between Late Antiquity and the Early Middle Ages: Archaeological Sources". Medieval Archaeology (PDF). Vol. XIX. Florence: All'insegna del giglio.
- Quieti, Giuseppe (2010) [1992]. Pescara Ancient City. Pescara: Carsa Edizioni.
- Staffa, Andrea (1993). Pescara Antica. The Recovery of S. Gerusalemme (PDF). Pescara: Carsa Edizioni.
- Staffa, Andrea (1994). "Forms of Early Medieval Settlement in Abruzzo: An Ethnoarchaeological Approach". Residential Architecture Between the 5th and 8th Centuries (PDF). Mantua: SAP Società Archeologica.
- Staffa, Andrea (1995). "A Borderland: Abruzzo and Molise Between the 6th and 7th Centuries". Cities, Castles, and Countryside in Border Territories (6th-7th Centuries) (PDF). Mantua: SAP Società Archeologica.
- Staffa, Andrea (1996). "The Pescara Valley Project: The Territory Between Antiquity and the Early Middle Ages (IV Report of the Pescara Valley Project)". Abruzzo - Journal of the Institute of Abruzzese Studies (PDF). Vol. II.
- Gasca Queirazza, Giuliano (1996). Dictionary of Toponymy. History and Meaning of Italian Geographical Names (PDF). Milan: Garzanti. p. 483.
- Staffa, Andrea (1997). "The Lombards in Abruzzo (6th-7th Centuries)". Central-Northern Italy in the Lombard Age (PDF). Florence: All'insegna del giglio.
- Staffa, Andrea (1998a). "Roman Cities of Adriatic Abruzzo". Journal of Ancient Topography (PDF). Proceedings of the Second Congress of Ancient Topography "The Roman City" (Rome, May 15–16, 1996). Part II. Vol. VIII. Galatina: Congedo Editore.
- Touring Club Italiano (1998). Pescara and Province. The Coast, National Parks, Ancient Villages, Abbeys. Guide d'Italia. Milan: Touring editore. ISBN 978-88-365-1192-1.
- Staffa, Andrea (1999). "Ancient Cities of Abruzzo. From Origins to the Late Roman Crisis". Bulletin of the Municipal Archaeological Commission of Rome (PDF). Vol. XCVIII. Rome: L'Erma di Bretschneider. ISBN 978-88-8265-662-1.
- Ronga, Nello (April 1999). The Neapolitan Republic of 1799 in the Atella Territory. Frattamaggiore: Istituto di studi atellani.
- Costantini, Massimo; Felice, Costantino (2000). History of Italy. The Regions from Unification to Today. XV: Abruzzo. Grandi Opere. Turin: Giulio Einaudi Editore.
- Staffa, Andrea (2001a). "Abruzzo: Port Structures and Coastal Layout Between the Roman Era and the Early Middle Ages". Port Structures and Maritime Routes in the Adriatic of the Roman Era (PDF). Antichità altoadriatiche. Vol. XLVI. Rome: Editreg.
- Staffa, Andrea (2001b). "Contribution to a Reconstruction of the Settlement Framework from Antiquity to the Middle Ages". From the Piomba Valley to the Lower Pescara Valley (pdf). Documenti dell'Abruzzo teramano. Pescara: Carsa Edizioni.
- Bertillo, Antonio; Franco, Dimitri (2001). Pescara in the Storm Photo Album 1940-1944. Montesilvano: Progetto incontro.
- Staffa, Andrea (2002). "The Territory of the Province of Pescara Between the 4th and 2nd Centuries BC". The Battle of Sentino. Clash of Nations and Meeting in a Nation (PDF). Rome: Il Calamo.
- Staffa, Andrea (2005). "The Origins of the Border: Lombards and Byzantines in the Upper Teramano (6th-7th Centuries)". The Border Over Time: Proceedings of the Conference: Ancarano 22-24 May 2000 (PDF). L'Aquila: Edizioni Libreria Colacchi.
- Touring Club Italiano (2005). Italy - Abruzzo and Molise. Milan: Touring Editore.
- Staffa, Andrea (2006). "The Roman and Early Medieval Port of Pescara". Journal of Ancient Topography. XVI. Galatina: Congedo Editore.
- Pelagatti, Giancarlo (2008). "From the "Synagogue of Satan" to the New Jerusalem. The Archetype of the Deicidal Jew and the Origins of the Church of S. Cetteo in Pescara". Bulletin No. XCVI (2006). L'Aquila: Deputazione abruzzese di storia patria.
- Morelli, Vittorio (2009). The Lombards in Abruzzo and Molise. Chieti: Libreria universitaria editrice.
- Fusco, Idamaria (2009). The Plague of 1656-58 in the Kingdom of Naples: Spread and Mortality. Naples: Istituto di studi sulle società del Mediterraneo.
- Staffa, Andrea (2012). "Urban Centers of Adriatic Abruzzo: Origins of Settlement". Formative and Evolutionary Processes of the City in the Adriatic Area (PDF). BAR International Series 2419. Oxford: Archaeopress.
- Di Dato, Ferdinando (2012). Naples, Pasquale Turiello, and "La rassegna agraria, commerciale, industriale, politica" by Eduardo Capuano (1892-1910). Naples: Photocity edizioni.
- Staffa, Andrea (2013). Castello Marcantonio in Cepagatti. A Place in History. Cepagatti: Castello Marcantonio.
- Perfetto, Simonluca; Giuliani, Achille (2013). Feudal and Monetary Policy of Alfonso of Aragon. The Marquisate of Pescara Under the Avalos-Aquino and the Unknown Aragonese Mint of Rocca San Giovanni. Cassino: Libreria Classica Editrice Diana.
- Perfetto, Simonluca (2014). The Oil Trade Through the Port Route of Spanish Pescara (1554-1557). Pescara: Museo delle Genti d'Abruzzo.
- Fusco, Idamaria (2016). The Role of Anthropic and Physical Factors in the Spread of the 1656-58 Plague Epidemic in the Kingdom of Naples (PDF). Naples: Istituto di Studi sulle Società del Mediterraneo.

Other texts

- Colapietra, Raffaele (2014) [1960]. Abruzzo in 1860. Piccola biblioteca. L'Aquila: Textus edizioni.
- Lopez, Luigi (1990). Pescara, from the Restoration to 1860. L'Aquila: Deputazione abruzzese di storia patria.
- Lopez, Luigi (1993). Pescara: From Its Origins to the Present Day. Pescara: Nova Italica.
- Bianchetti, Cristina (1997). Cities in the History of Italy. Pescara. Grandi opere. Bari: Editori Laterza.
- Staffa, Andrea (1998b). "Medieval Excavations in Abruzzo 1994-95". Medieval Excavations in Italy 1994-1995 (PDF). Rome: Herder.
- Bertillo, Antonio; Pittarello, Giampietro (1998). "The Martyrdom of a City: Pescara and the War 1940/1944". Progetto Incontro. Montesilvano.
- Di Biase, Licio (1998). Castellammare Over Time. News, Curiosities, Legends, and a Bit of History of the Forgotten Pescara. Pescara: Edizioni Tracce.
- Di Biase, Licio (2010). The Great History. Pescara-Castellammare from Its Origins to the 20th Century. Pescara: Edizioni Tracce.
- Di Biase, Licio (2011). The Madonna of the Seven Sorrows Between History and Legend. Pescara Colli. Pescara: Edizioni Tracce.
