= List of municipalities of the Province of Teramo =

The following is a list of the 47 municipalities (comuni) of the Province of Teramo in the region of Abruzzo in Italy.

== List ==
| Municipality | Population (2026) | Area (km^{2}) | Density |
|---|---|---|---|
| Alba Adriatica | 13,325 | 9.60 | 1,388.0 |
| Ancarano | 1,874 | 13.92 | 134.6 |
| Arsita | 717 | 34.14 | 21.0 |
| Atri | 9,814 | 92.18 | 106.5 |
| Basciano | 2,312 | 18.85 | 122.7 |
| Bellante | 6,833 | 50.04 | 136.6 |
| Bisenti | 1,642 | 30.88 | 53.2 |
| Campli | 6,612 | 73.43 | 90.0 |
| Canzano | 1,736 | 16.74 | 103.7 |
| Castel Castagna | 400 | 18.16 | 22.0 |
| Castellalto | 7,234 | 34.18 | 211.6 |
| Castelli | 907 | 49.68 | 18.3 |
| Castiglione Messer Raimondo | 1,961 | 30.69 | 63.9 |
| Castilenti | 1,307 | 23.79 | 54.9 |
| Cellino Attanasio | 2,184 | 43.94 | 49.7 |
| Cermignano | 1,397 | 26.36 | 53.0 |
| Civitella del Tronto | 4,555 | 77.74 | 58.6 |
| Colledara | 2,078 | 18.01 | 115.4 |
| Colonnella | 3,718 | 21.63 | 171.9 |
| Controguerra | 2,174 | 22.82 | 95.3 |
| Corropoli | 5,158 | 22.11 | 233.3 |
| Cortino | 541 | 62.95 | 8.6 |
| Crognaleto | 1,009 | 124.30 | 8.1 |
| Fano Adriano | 243 | 35.77 | 6.8 |
| Giulianova | 23,556 | 28.00 | 841.3 |
| Isola del Gran Sasso d'Italia | 4,400 | 84.05 | 52.3 |
| Martinsicuro | 16,483 | 14.66 | 1,124.4 |
| Montefino | 896 | 18.59 | 48.2 |
| Montorio al Vomano | 7,344 | 53.57 | 137.1 |
| Morro d'Oro | 3,530 | 28.73 | 122.9 |
| Mosciano Sant'Angelo | 9,206 | 48.45 | 190.0 |
| Nereto | 5,465 | 7.01 | 779.6 |
| Notaresco | 6,351 | 38.15 | 166.5 |
| Penna Sant'Andrea | 1,627 | 11.10 | 146.6 |
| Pietracamela | 196 | 44.49 | 4.4 |
| Pineto | 14,761 | 38.11 | 387.3 |
| Rocca Santa Maria | 450 | 61.80 | 7.3 |
| Roseto degli Abruzzi | 25,938 | 53.27 | 486.9 |
| Sant'Egidio alla Vibrata | 9,913 | 18.36 | 539.9 |
| Sant'Omero | 5,077 | 34.20 | 148.5 |
| Silvi | 15,478 | 20.63 | 750.3 |
| Teramo | 51,400 | 152.84 | 336.3 |
| Torano Nuovo | 1,440 | 10.22 | 140.9 |
| Torricella Sicura | 2,365 | 54.38 | 43.5 |
| Tortoreto | 12,206 | 22.97 | 531.4 |
| Tossicia | 1,204 | 27.14 | 44.4 |
| Valle Castellana | 818 | 131.76 | 6.2 |

== See also ==
- List of municipalities of Abruzzo
- List of municipalities of Italy
