= List of municipalities of Abruzzo =

Location of Abruzzo within Italy

Provinces of Abruzzo

This is a list of the municipalities (comuni) of the region of Abruzzo in Italy.

There are 305 municipalities in Abruzzo as of 2026:

- 104 in the Province of Chieti
- 108 in the Province of L'Aquila
- 46 in the Province of Pescara
- 47 in the Province of Teramo

== List ==
Municipality	Province	Population (2026)	Area (km²)	Density
Abbateggio	Pescara	345	15.40	22.4
Acciano	L'Aquila	252	32.22	7.8
Aielli	L'Aquila	1,370	37.52	36.5
Alanno	Pescara	3,262	32.53	100.3
Alba Adriatica	Teramo	13,325	9.60	1,388.0
Alfedena	L'Aquila	917	39.96	22.9
Altino	Chieti	3,010	15.33	196.3
Ancarano	Teramo	1,874	13.92	134.6
Anversa degli Abruzzi	L'Aquila	304	32.43	9.4
Archi	Chieti	1,929	28.54	67.6
Ari	Chieti	1,071	11.39	94.0
Arielli	Chieti	1,042	11.72	88.9
Arsita	Teramo	717	34.14	21.0
Ateleta	L'Aquila	1,103	41.93	26.3
Atessa	Chieti	10,208	110.98	92.0
Atri	Teramo	9,814	92.18	106.5
Avezzano	L'Aquila	41,238	104.09	396.2
Balsorano	L'Aquila	3,196	58.85	54.3
Barete	L'Aquila	634	24.59	25.8
Barisciano	L'Aquila	1,637	78.49	20.9
Barrea	L'Aquila	677	87.11	7.8
Basciano	Teramo	2,312	18.85	122.7
Bellante	Teramo	6,833	50.04	136.6
Bisegna	L'Aquila	212	46.59	4.6
Bisenti	Teramo	1,642	30.88	53.2
Bolognano	Pescara	1,003	16.96	59.1
Bomba	Chieti	686	17.26	39.7
Borrello	Chieti	328	14.51	22.6
Brittoli	Pescara	236	15.99	14.8
Bucchianico	Chieti	4,892	38.08	128.5
Bugnara	L'Aquila	998	25.12	39.7
Bussi sul Tirino	Pescara	2,188	25.91	84.4
Cagnano Amiterno	L'Aquila	1,079	61.32	17.6
Calascio	L'Aquila	119	39.44	3.0
Campli	Teramo	6,612	73.43	90.0
Campo di Giove	L'Aquila	742	28.90	25.7
Campotosto	L'Aquila	428	51.73	8.3
Canistro	L'Aquila	949	15.91	59.6
Canosa Sannita	Chieti	1,207	13.91	86.8
Cansano	L'Aquila	216	37.70	5.7
Canzano	Teramo	1,736	16.74	103.7
Capestrano	L'Aquila	811	43.66	18.6
Capistrello	L'Aquila	4,596	60.97	75.4
Capitignano	L'Aquila	602	30.64	19.6
Caporciano	L'Aquila	201	18.62	10.8
Cappadocia	L'Aquila	588	68.58	8.6
Cappelle sul Tavo	Pescara	4,106	5.41	759.0
Caramanico Terme	Pescara	1,703	84.99	20.0
Carapelle Calvisio	L'Aquila	68	14.79	4.6
Carpineto della Nora	Pescara	498	24.08	20.7
Carpineto Sinello	Chieti	486	29.85	16.3
Carsoli	L'Aquila	4,952	95.80	51.7
Carunchio	Chieti	535	32.56	16.4
Casacanditella	Chieti	1,172	12.54	93.5
Casalanguida	Chieti	789	13.67	57.7
Casalbordino	Chieti	5,591	46.02	121.5
Casalincontrada	Chieti	2,960	16.00	185.0
Casoli	Chieti	5,033	67.04	75.1
Castel Castagna	Teramo	400	18.16	22.0
Castel del Monte	L'Aquila	379	58.03	6.5
Castel di Ieri	L'Aquila	273	18.88	14.5
Castel di Sangro	L'Aquila	6,590	84.44	78.0
Castel Frentano	Chieti	4,181	21.89	191.0
Castelguidone	Chieti	270	15.07	17.9
Castellafiume	L'Aquila	1,077	24.10	44.7
Castellalto	Teramo	7,234	34.18	211.6
Castelli	Teramo	907	49.68	18.3
Castelvecchio Calvisio	L'Aquila	125	15.32	8.2
Castelvecchio Subequo	L'Aquila	803	19.29	41.6
Castiglione a Casauria	Pescara	723	16.57	43.6
Castiglione Messer Marino	Chieti	1,398	47.99	29.1
Castiglione Messer Raimondo	Teramo	1,961	30.69	63.9
Castilenti	Teramo	1,307	23.79	54.9
Catignano	Pescara	1,232	17.03	72.3
Celano	L'Aquila	10,121	82.80	122.2
Celenza sul Trigno	Chieti	758	22.68	33.4
Cellino Attanasio	Teramo	2,184	43.94	49.7
Cepagatti	Pescara	11,030	30.82	357.9
Cerchio	L'Aquila	1,542	20.17	76.5
Cermignano	Teramo	1,397	26.36	53.0
Chieti	Chieti	48,368	59.57	812.0
Città Sant'Angelo	Pescara	14,935	62.02	240.8
Civita d'Antino	L'Aquila	923	28.35	32.6
Civitaluparella	Chieti	272	22.46	12.1
Civitaquana	Pescara	1,156	21.88	52.8
Civitella Alfedena	L'Aquila	287	29.49	9.7
Civitella Casanova	Pescara	1,505	31.10	48.4
Civitella del Tronto	Teramo	4,555	77.74	58.6
Civitella Messer Raimondo	Chieti	738	12.72	58.0
Civitella Roveto	L'Aquila	3,018	45.45	66.4
Cocullo	L'Aquila	203	31.61	6.4
Collarmele	L'Aquila	752	23.94	31.4
Collecorvino	Pescara	6,065	31.99	189.6
Colledara	Teramo	2,078	18.01	115.4
Colledimacine	Chieti	149	11.30	13.2
Colledimezzo	Chieti	401	11.05	36.3
Collelongo	L'Aquila	1,055	54.02	19.5
Collepietro	L'Aquila	200	15.21	13.1
Colonnella	Teramo	3,718	21.63	171.9
Controguerra	Teramo	2,174	22.82	95.3
Corfinio	L'Aquila	947	17.95	52.8
Corropoli	Teramo	5,158	22.11	233.3
Cortino	Teramo	541	62.95	8.6
Corvara	Pescara	186	13.73	13.5
Crecchio	Chieti	2,550	19.23	132.6
Crognaleto	Teramo	1,009	124.30	8.1
Cugnoli	Pescara	1,324	15.96	83.0
Cupello	Chieti	4,899	48.39	101.2
Dogliola	Chieti	304	11.85	25.7
Elice	Pescara	1,615	14.31	112.9
Fagnano Alto	L'Aquila	337	24.64	13.7
Fallo	Chieti	121	6.10	19.8
Fano Adriano	Teramo	243	35.77	6.8
Fara Filiorum Petri	Chieti	1,972	14.96	131.8
Fara San Martino	Chieti	1,253	44.69	28.0
Farindola	Pescara	1,293	45.47	28.4
Filetto	Chieti	807	13.53	59.6
Fontecchio	L'Aquila	280	16.86	16.6
Fossa	L'Aquila	682	8.71	78.3
Fossacesia	Chieti	6,269	30.14	208.0
Fraine	Chieti	238	16.09	14.8
Francavilla al Mare	Chieti	25,521	23.09	1,105.3
Fresagrandinaria	Chieti	913	25.15	36.3
Frisa	Chieti	1,594	11.49	138.7
Furci	Chieti	779	25.99	30.0
Gagliano Aterno	L'Aquila	221	32.15	6.9
Gamberale	Chieti	267	15.56	17.2
Gessopalena	Chieti	1,137	31.47	36.1
Gioia dei Marsi	L'Aquila	1,688	58.40	28.9
Gissi	Chieti	2,401	36.65	65.5
Giuliano Teatino	Chieti	1,105	9.89	111.7
Giulianova	Teramo	23,556	28.00	841.3
Goriano Sicoli	L'Aquila	523	20.24	25.8
Guardiagrele	Chieti	8,161	56.50	144.4
Guilmi	Chieti	443	12.56	35.3
Introdacqua	L'Aquila	1,928	37.11	52.0
Isola del Gran Sasso d'Italia	Teramo	4,400	84.05	52.3
L'Aquila	L'Aquila	70,803	473.91	149.4
Lama dei Peligni	Chieti	1,007	31.37	32.1
Lanciano	Chieti	33,843	66.94	505.6
Lecce nei Marsi	L'Aquila	1,476	66.47	22.2
Lentella	Chieti	653	12.62	51.7
Lettomanoppello	Pescara	2,603	15.07	172.7
Lettopalena	Chieti	306	21.13	14.5
Liscia	Chieti	623	8.18	76.2
Loreto Aprutino	Pescara	7,037	59.50	118.3
Luco dei Marsi	L'Aquila	5,935	44.87	132.3
Lucoli	L'Aquila	847	103.44	8.2
Magliano de' Marsi	L'Aquila	3,400	70.93	47.9
Manoppello	Pescara	6,762	39.26	172.2
Martinsicuro	Teramo	16,483	14.66	1,124.4
Massa d'Albe	L'Aquila	1,337	68.53	19.5
Miglianico	Chieti	4,620	22.73	203.3
Molina Aterno	L'Aquila	328	12.21	26.9
Montazzoli	Chieti	790	39.46	20.0
Montebello di Bertona	Pescara	803	21.50	37.3
Montebello sul Sangro	Chieti	80	5.38	14.9
Monteferrante	Chieti	100	15.29	6.5
Montefino	Teramo	896	18.59	48.2
Montelapiano	Chieti	68	8.27	8.2
Montenerodomo	Chieti	562	30.00	18.7
Monteodorisio	Chieti	2,314	25.21	91.8
Montereale	L'Aquila	2,183	104.42	20.9
Montesilvano	Pescara	53,557	23.57	2,272.3
Montorio al Vomano	Teramo	7,344	53.57	137.1
Morino	L'Aquila	1,280	51.28	25.0
Morro d'Oro	Teramo	3,530	28.73	122.9
Mosciano Sant'Angelo	Teramo	9,206	48.45	190.0
Moscufo	Pescara	3,166	20.26	156.3
Mozzagrogna	Chieti	2,422	14.10	171.8
Navelli	L'Aquila	583	42.00	13.9
Nereto	Teramo	5,465	7.01	779.6
Nocciano	Pescara	1,684	13.76	122.4
Notaresco	Teramo	6,351	38.15	166.5
Ocre	L'Aquila	1,095	23.60	46.4
Ofena	L'Aquila	462	36.90	12.5
Opi	L'Aquila	373	49.91	7.5
Oricola	L'Aquila	1,274	18.36	69.4
Orsogna	Chieti	3,595	25.45	141.3
Ortona	Chieti	21,921	70.88	309.3
Ortona dei Marsi	L'Aquila	366	57.17	6.4
Ortucchio	L'Aquila	1,736	39.00	44.5
Ovindoli	L'Aquila	1,154	61.38	18.8
Pacentro	L'Aquila	1,057	72.59	14.6
Paglieta	Chieti	4,100	33.78	121.4
Palena	Chieti	1,196	93.63	12.8
Palmoli	Chieti	851	32.78	26.0
Palombaro	Chieti	921	17.19	53.6
Penna Sant'Andrea	Teramo	1,627	11.10	146.6
Pennadomo	Chieti	201	11.02	18.2
Pennapiedimonte	Chieti	365	47.03	7.8
Penne	Pescara	10,906	91.20	119.6
Perano	Chieti	1,463	6.48	225.8
Pereto	L'Aquila	630	41.16	15.3
Pescara	Pescara	118,487	34.36	3,448.4
Pescasseroli	L'Aquila	1,993	91.17	21.9
Pescina	L'Aquila	3,654	48.80	74.9
Pescocostanzo	L'Aquila	1,081	55.06	19.6
Pescosansonesco	Pescara	439	18.35	23.9
Pettorano sul Gizio	L'Aquila	1,259	62.85	20.0
Pianella	Pescara	8,563	47.05	182.0
Picciano	Pescara	1,278	7.56	169.0
Pietracamela	Teramo	196	44.49	4.4
Pietraferrazzana	Chieti	126	4.37	28.8
Pietranico	Pescara	416	14.77	28.2
Pineto	Teramo	14,761	38.11	387.3
Pizzoferrato	Chieti	949	30.92	30.7
Pizzoli	L'Aquila	4,186	56.44	74.2
Poggio Picenze	L'Aquila	1,028	11.46	89.7
Poggiofiorito	Chieti	751	9.95	75.5
Pollutri	Chieti	2,016	26.17	77.0
Popoli	Pescara	4,574	35.04	130.5
Prata d'Ansidonia	L'Aquila	424	19.65	21.6
Pratola Peligna	L'Aquila	6,881	28.67	240.0
Pretoro	Chieti	859	26.13	32.9
Prezza	L'Aquila	804	21.60	37.2
Quadri	Chieti	672	7.45	90.2
Raiano	L'Aquila	2,595	28.99	89.5
Rapino	Chieti	1,115	20.30	54.9
Ripa Teatina	Chieti	3,899	20.16	193.4
Rivisondoli	L'Aquila	680	32.00	21.3
Rocca di Botte	L'Aquila	891	31.11	28.6
Rocca di Cambio	L'Aquila	523	27.62	18.9
Rocca di Mezzo	L'Aquila	1,314	90.55	14.5
Rocca Pia	L'Aquila	153	44.96	3.4
Rocca San Giovanni	Chieti	2,299	21.70	105.9
Rocca Santa Maria	Teramo	450	61.80	7.3
Roccacasale	L'Aquila	562	17.31	32.5
Roccamontepiano	Chieti	1,533	18.22	84.1
Roccamorice	Pescara	840	25.06	33.5
Roccaraso	L'Aquila	1,460	49.91	29.3
Roccascalegna	Chieti	1,011	23.01	43.9
Roccaspinalveti	Chieti	1,121	33.01	34.0
Roio del Sangro	Chieti	101	11.81	8.6
Rosciano	Pescara	4,114	27.79	148.0
Rosello	Chieti	175	19.23	9.1
Roseto degli Abruzzi	Teramo	25,938	53.27	486.9
Salle	Pescara	250	21.80	11.5
San Benedetto dei Marsi	L'Aquila	3,715	16.76	221.7
San Benedetto in Perillis	L'Aquila	100	19.10	5.2
San Buono	Chieti	835	25.27	33.0
San Demetrio ne' Vestini	L'Aquila	2,002	16.49	121.4
San Giovanni Lipioni	Chieti	139	8.67	16.0
San Giovanni Teatino	Chieti	14,541	17.73	820.1
San Martino sulla Marrucina	Chieti	868	7.41	117.1
San Pio delle Camere	L'Aquila	663	17.21	38.5
San Salvo	Chieti	19,918	19.70	1,011.1
San Valentino in Abruzzo Citeriore	Pescara	1,788	16.40	109.0
San Vincenzo Valle Roveto	L'Aquila	2,013	46.04	43.7
San Vito Chietino	Chieti	5,058	17.00	297.5
Sant'Egidio alla Vibrata	Teramo	9,913	18.36	539.9
Sant'Eufemia a Maiella	Pescara	233	40.42	5.8
Sant'Eusanio del Sangro	Chieti	2,224	23.83	93.3
Sant'Eusanio Forconese	L'Aquila	364	7.94	45.8
Sant'Omero	Teramo	5,077	34.20	148.5
Santa Maria Imbaro	Chieti	2,022	5.71	354.1
Sante Marie	L'Aquila	1,053	40.82	25.8
Santo Stefano di Sessanio	L'Aquila	102	33.70	3.0
Scafa	Pescara	3,388	10.34	327.7
Scanno	L'Aquila	1,662	134.68	12.3
Scerni	Chieti	2,901	41.26	70.3
Schiavi di Abruzzo	Chieti	616	45.58	13.5
Scontrone	L'Aquila	535	21.36	25.0
Scoppito	L'Aquila	3,809	53.00	71.9
Scurcola Marsicana	L'Aquila	2,700	30.38	88.9
Secinaro	L'Aquila	302	33.34	9.1
Serramonacesca	Pescara	493	23.89	20.6
Silvi	Teramo	15,478	20.63	750.3
Spoltore	Pescara	18,924	37.01	511.3
Sulmona	L'Aquila	21,610	57.93	373.0
Tagliacozzo	L'Aquila	6,417	87.46	73.4
Taranta Peligna	Chieti	301	21.90	13.7
Teramo	Teramo	51,400	152.84	336.3
Tione degli Abruzzi	L'Aquila	243	39.66	6.1
Tocco da Casauria	Pescara	2,325	29.67	78.4
Tollo	Chieti	3,868	14.96	258.6
Torano Nuovo	Teramo	1,440	10.22	140.9
Torino di Sangro	Chieti	2,925	32.12	91.1
Tornareccio	Chieti	1,640	27.53	59.6
Tornimparte	L'Aquila	2,729	65.96	41.4
Torre de' Passeri	Pescara	2,862	5.92	483.4
Torrebruna	Chieti	635	23.29	27.3
Torrevecchia Teatina	Chieti	4,183	14.68	284.9
Torricella Peligna	Chieti	1,077	36.11	29.8
Torricella Sicura	Teramo	2,365	54.38	43.5
Tortoreto	Teramo	12,206	22.97	531.4
Tossicia	Teramo	1,204	27.14	44.4
Trasacco	L'Aquila	5,804	51.44	112.8
Treglio	Chieti	1,721	4.88	352.7
Tufillo	Chieti	307	21.44	14.3
Turrivalignani	Pescara	785	6.11	128.5
Vacri	Chieti	1,471	12.27	119.9
Valle Castellana	Teramo	818	131.76	6.2
Vasto	Chieti	40,920	71.35	573.5
Vicoli	Pescara	357	9.33	38.3
Villa Celiera	Pescara	524	13.18	39.8
Villa Sant'Angelo	L'Aquila	511	5.22	97.9
Villa Santa Lucia degli Abruzzi	L'Aquila	76	26.99	2.8
Villa Santa Maria	Chieti	1,072	16.23	66.1
Villalago	L'Aquila	490	33.20	14.8
Villalfonsina	Chieti	855	9.13	93.6
Villamagna	Chieti	2,126	12.73	167.0
Villavallelonga	L'Aquila	822	73.74	11.1
Villetta Barrea	L'Aquila	589	20.53	28.7
Vittorito	L'Aquila	804	14.19	56.7
