= Cavuccio =

Coordinates: 42°38′34″N 13°39′17″E

- Frazione
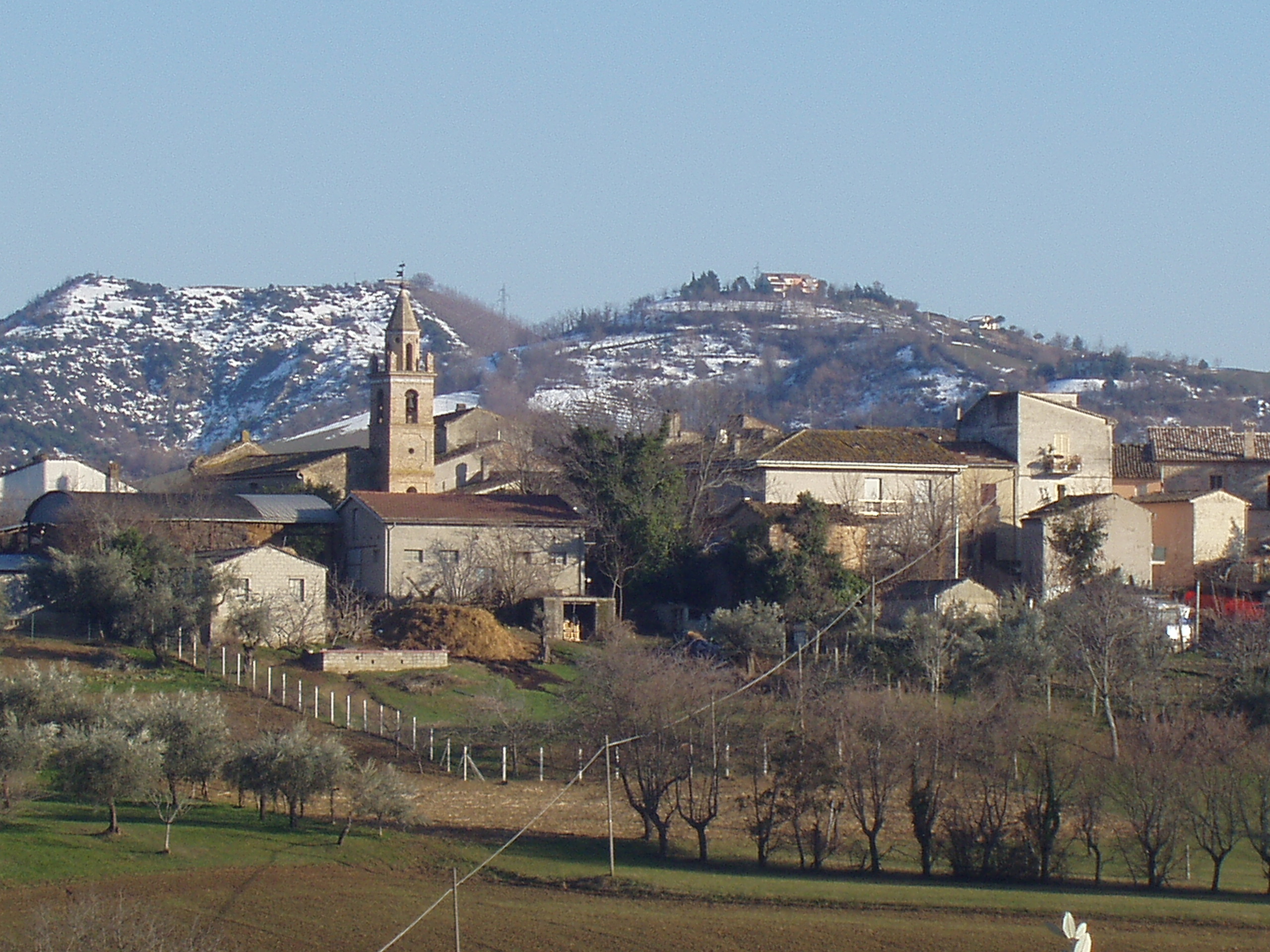
- Cavuccio
- Interactive map of Cavuccio
- Country: Italy
- Region: Abruzzo
- Province: Teramo
- Commune: Teramo
- Time zone: UTC+1 (CET)
  - Summer (DST): UTC+2 (CEST)

Cavuccio is a frazione in the Province of Teramo in the Abruzzo region of Italy.
