= Montone, Mosciano Sant'Angelo =

Montone
- Frazione
- Location within Italy
- Coordinates: 42.7°N 13.9°E
- Country: Italy
- Region: Abruzzo
- Province: Teramo
- Time zone: UTC+1 (CET)
  - Summer (DST): UTC+2 (CEST)

Montone is a frazione in the Province of Teramo in the Abruzzo region of Italy. It is known for its three towers and remains of a walk, and the burial sarcophagus of the nobleman Bucciarello di Jacobo di Bartolomeo in the church of San Antonio Abate.

== Places of interest ==
- Church of Saint Nicholas
- Church of Sant'Anna
- Church of Sant'Antonio Abate
- Church of Santa Maria Assunta

== Traditions ==
A feast in honor of Saint Anne and Saint James takes place between July 24-26, this includes processions, masses, and fireworks.
