= Putignano, Teramo =

Coordinates: 42°40′58″N 13°39′50″E

Putignano
- Frazione
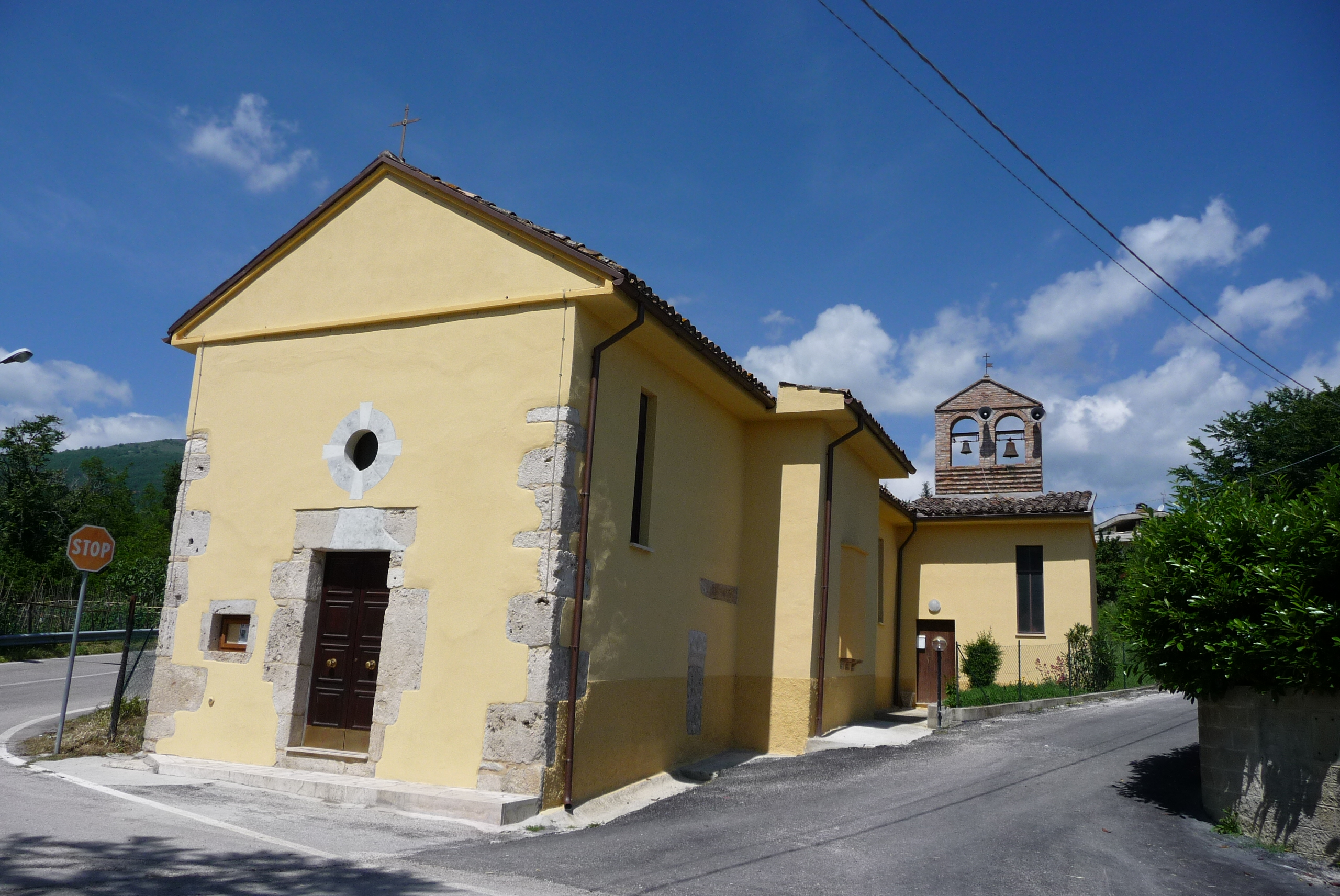
- The church of San Felice in Putignano
- Interactive map of Putignano
- Country: Italy
- Region: Abruzzo
- Province: Teramo
- Commune: Teramo
- Time zone: UTC+1 (CET)
  - Summer (DST): UTC+2 (CEST)

Putignano is a frazione in the Province of Teramo in the Abruzzo region of Italy. The main historical site in the village is the parish church of San Felice.
