= Ripe di Civitella =

Coordinates: 42°44′57″N 13°37′36″E

- Frazione
- Interactive map of Ripe di Civitella
- Country: Italy
- Region: Abruzzo
- Province: Teramo
- Time zone: UTC+1 (CET)
  - Summer (DST): UTC+2 (CEST)

Ripe di Civitella is a frazione in the Province of Teramo in the Abruzzo region of Italy.

Ripe di Civitella is a frazione of the municipality of Civitella del Tronto, in the Province of Teramo in the Abruzzo region of Italy. Located on the slopes of the Montagna dei Fiori near the Salinello Gorges and Grotta Sant'Angelo, the area has yielded archaeological remains dating from the Neolithic to the Iron Age."Ripe (Civitella del Tronto)"."Civitella del Tronto". Parco Nazionale del Gran Sasso e Monti della Laga.
