= Leofara =

Coordinates: 42°44′37″N 13°33′09″E

- Frazione
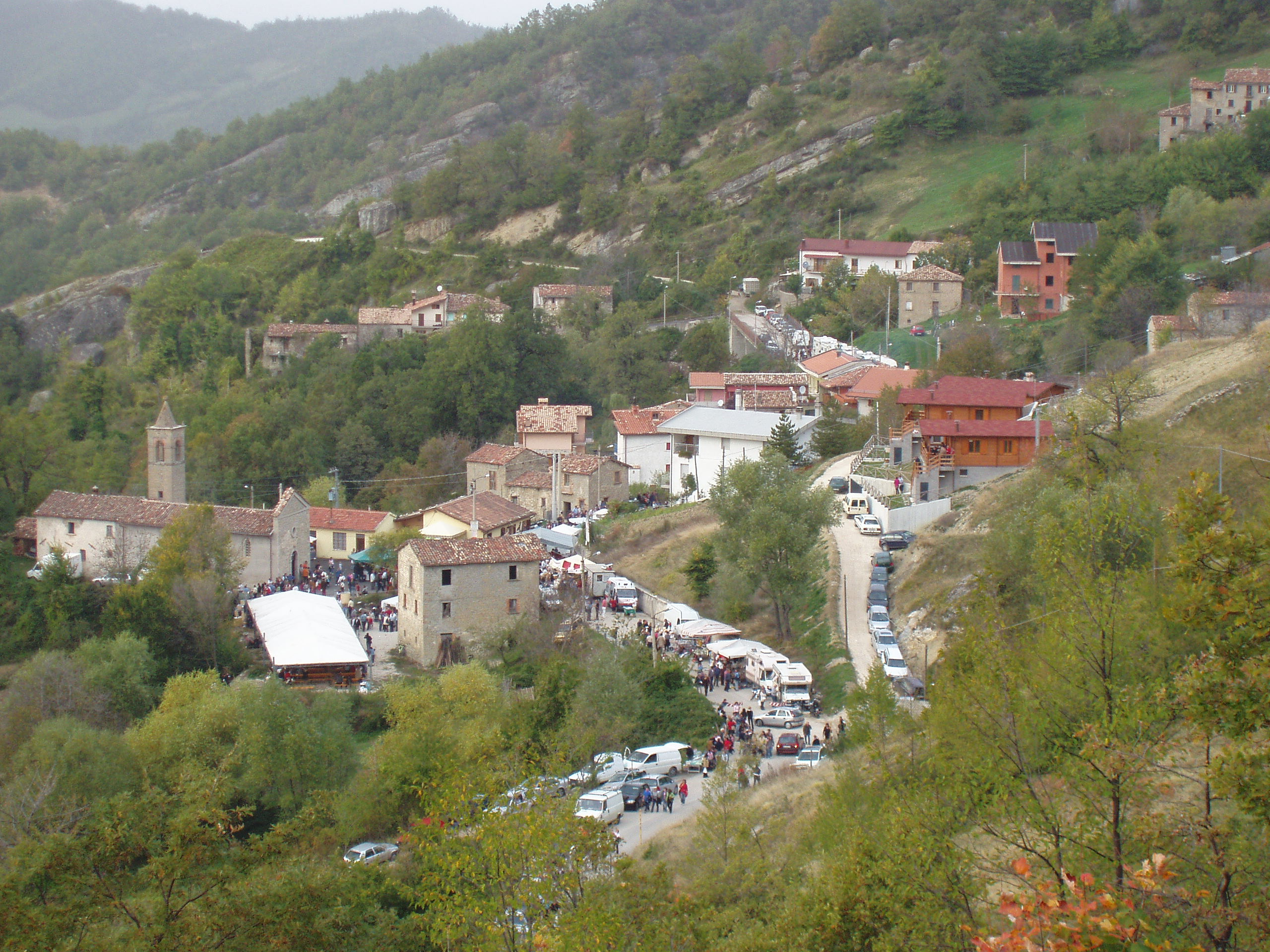
- Leofara in 2004
- Interactive map of Leofara
- Country: Italy
- Region: Abruzzo
- Province: Teramo
- Elevation: 3,600 ft (1,100 m)

Population (2001)
  - Total: 26
- Time zone: UTC+1 (CET)
  - Summer (DST): UTC+2 (CEST)

Leofara is a frazione in the Province of Teramo in the Abruzzo region of Italy.
