= Bivio Castelli =

Coordinates: 42°31′54″N 13°46′29″E

- Frazione
- Interactive map of Bivio Castelli
- Country: Italy
- Region: Abruzzo
- Province: Teramo
- Time zone: UTC+1 (CET)
  - Summer (DST): UTC+2 (CEST)

Bivio Castelli is a frazione in the Province of Teramo in the Abruzzo region of Italy.
