= Canzano =

- Comune
- Comune di Canzano
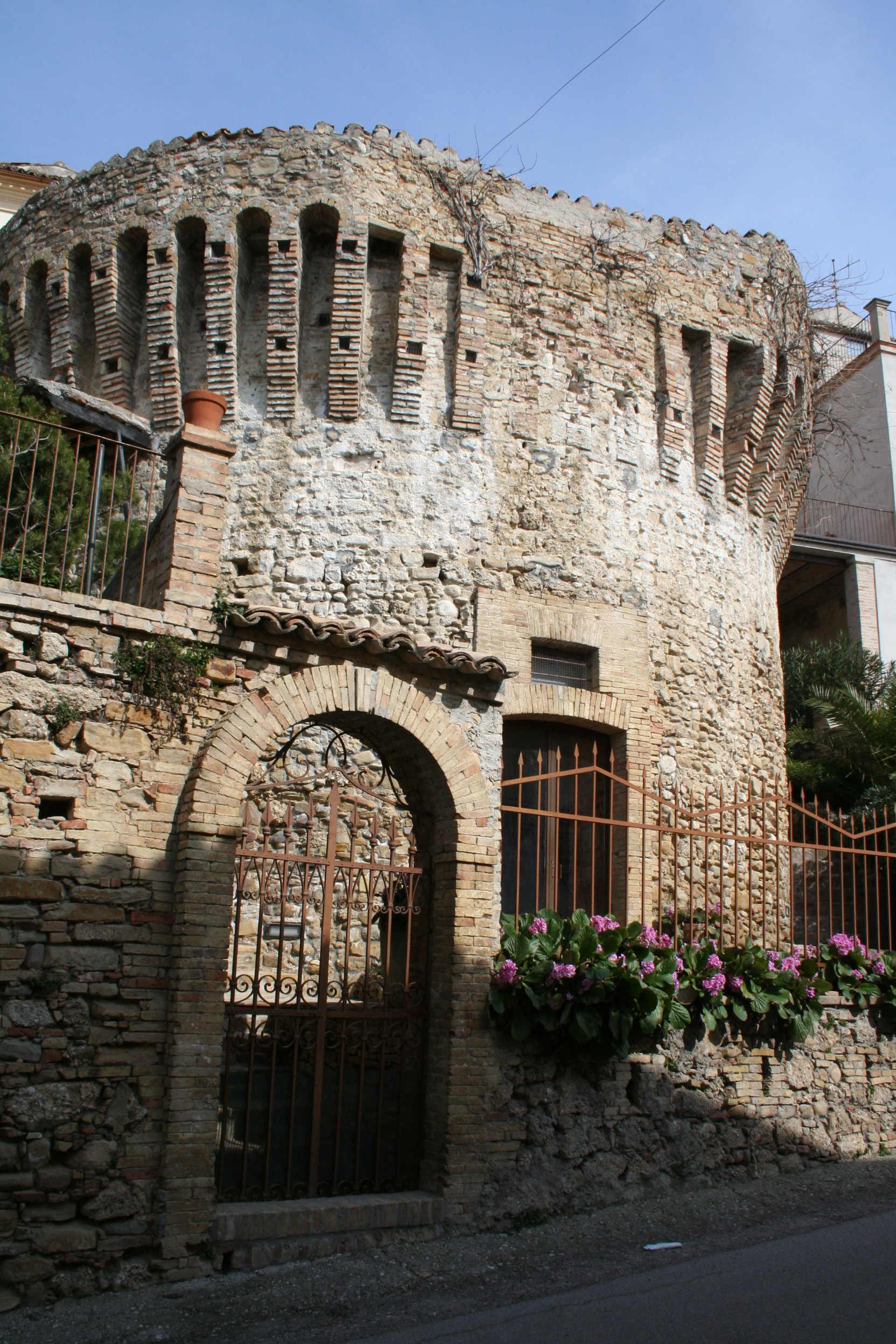

- Location within Italy Location within Abruzzo
- Coordinates: 42°39′N 13°48′E
- Country: Italy
- Region: Abruzzo
- Province: Teramo (TE)
- Frazioni: Castellalto, Cermignano, Teramo

Area
  - Total: 16 km^{2} (6.2 sq mi)
- Elevation: 448 m (1,470 ft)

Population (31 December 2006)
  - Total: 1,861
  - Density: 120/km^{2} (300/sq mi)
- Demonym: Canzanesi
- Time zone: UTC+1 (CET)
  - Summer (DST): UTC+2 (CEST)
- Postal code: 64020
- Dialing code: 0861
- ISTAT code: 067009
- Patron saint: San Biagio
- Saint day: 3 February
- Website: Official website

Canzano (Abruzzese: Canzanë) is a town and comune in Teramo province in the Abruzzo region of eastern Italy.
