= Tossicia =

- Comune
- Comune di Tossicia
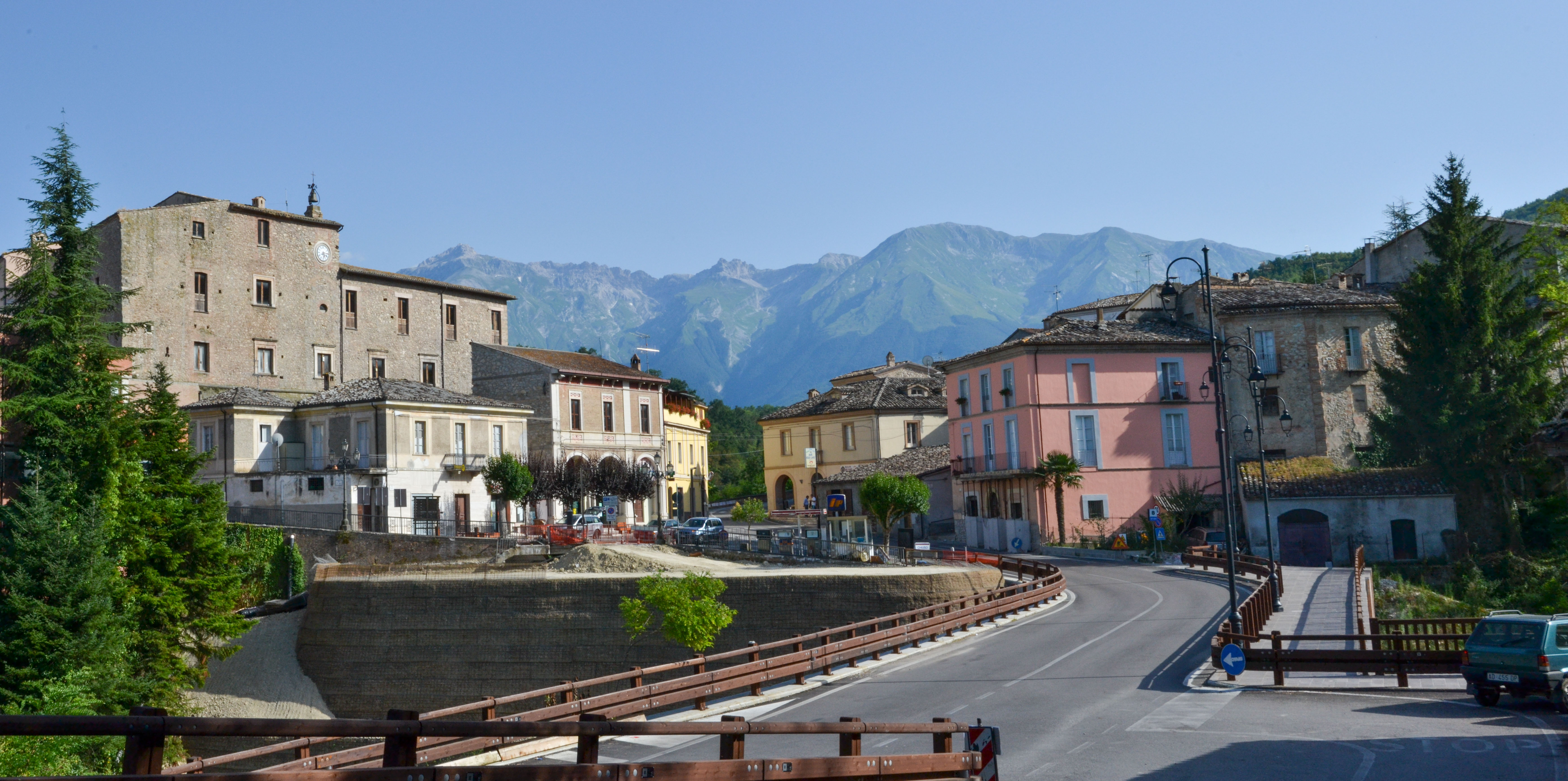

- Location within Italy Location within Abruzzo
- Coordinates: 42°33′N 13°39′E
- Country: Italy
- Region: Abruzzo
- Province: Teramo (TE)
- Frazioni: Aquilano, Azzinano, Case di Renzo, Chiarino, Flamignano, Garisciano, Paduli, Palozza, Petrignano, Cerquone, Camerale, Colledonico (partly in the comune of Montorio al Vomano), Tozzanella.

Government
  - Mayor: Franco Tarquini

Area
  - Total: 27.14 km^{2} (10.48 sq mi)
- Elevation: 409 m (1,342 ft)

Population (1 January 2016)
  - Total: 1,406
  - Density: 51.81/km^{2} (134.2/sq mi)
- Demonym: Tossiciani
- Time zone: UTC+1 (CET)
  - Summer (DST): UTC+2 (CEST)
- Postal code: 64049
- Dialing code: 0861
- Patron saint: Santa Sinforosa
- Saint day: 18 July
- Website: Official website

Tossicia (Abruzzese: Tussëcië) is a town and comune in province of Teramo in the Abruzzo region of eastern Italy. It is located in the natural park known as the "Gran Sasso e Monti della Laga National Park".
