= Torano Nuovo =

- Comune
- Comune di Torano Nuovo
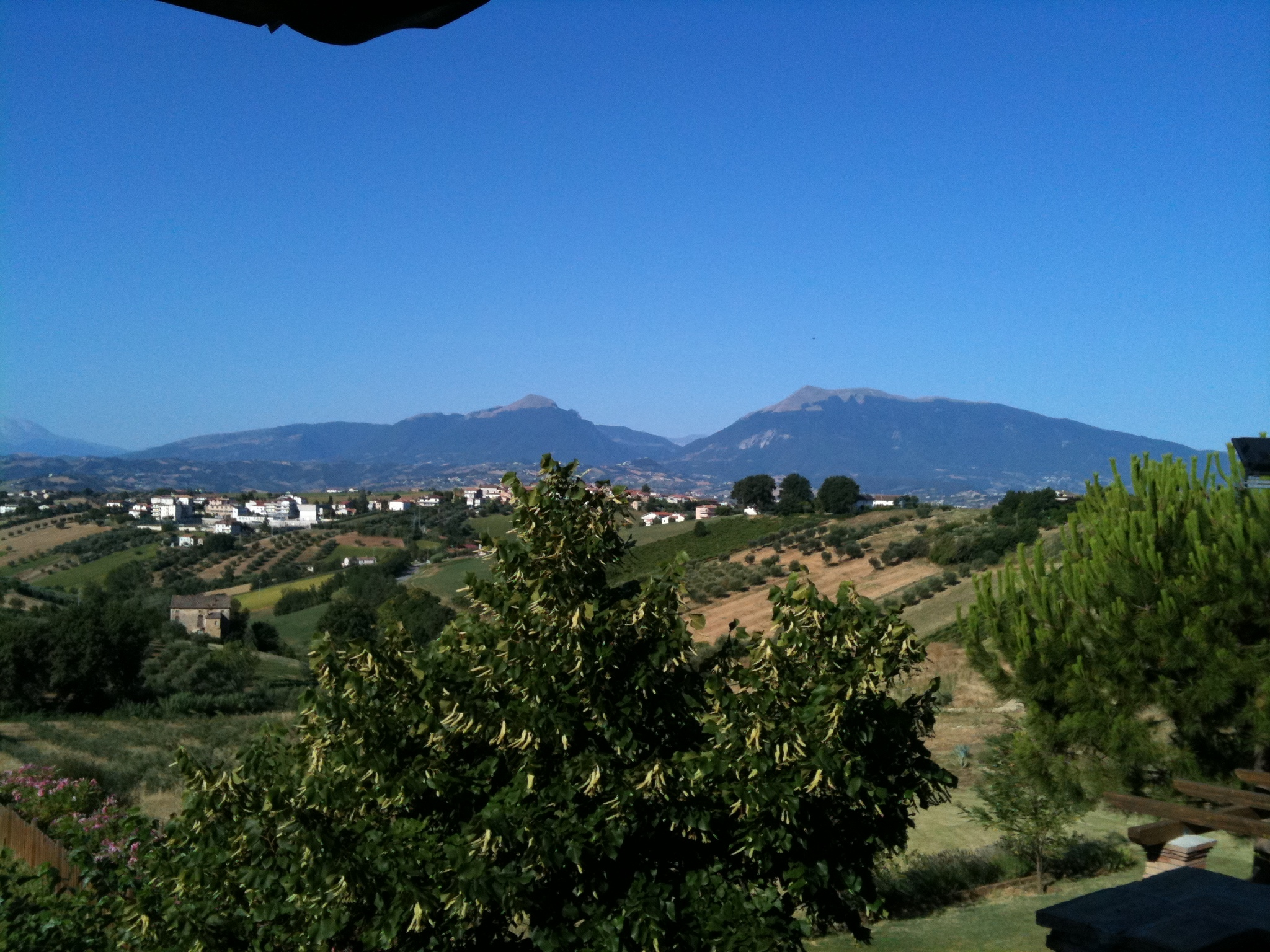

- Location within Italy Location within Abruzzo
- Coordinates: 42°49′N 13°47′E
- Country: Italy
- Region: Abruzzo
- Province: Teramo (TE)
- Frazioni: Petrella, Valle Santa Maria, Villa Bizzarri

Area
  - Total: 10 km^{2} (3.9 sq mi)
- Elevation: 237 m (778 ft)

Population (1 January 2007)
  - Total: 1,664
  - Density: 170/km^{2} (430/sq mi)
- Demonym: Toranesi
- Time zone: UTC+1 (CET)
  - Summer (DST): UTC+2 (CEST)
- Postal code: 64010
- Dialing code: 0861
- ISTAT code: 067042
- Patron saint: San Flaviano, Patriarca di Costantinopoli and Martire
- Saint day: 24 November
- Website: Official website

Torano Nuovo is a town and comune in Teramo province in the Abruzzo region of eastern Italy.

== Notable residents ==
- Emidio Pepe, vintner
