= Arsita =

- Comune
- Comune di Arsita
- Location within Italy Location within Abruzzo
- Coordinates: 42°30′N 13°47′E
- Country: Italy
- Region: Abruzzo
- Province: Teramo (TE)
- Frazioni: Cacciafumo, Collemesolo, Figliolarsita, Pantane, Valleiannina

Area
  - Total: 34 km^{2} (13 sq mi)
- Elevation: 470 m (1,540 ft)

Population (2007)
  - Total: 961
  - Density: 28/km^{2} (73/sq mi)
- Time zone: UTC+1 (CET)
  - Summer (DST): UTC+2 (CEST)
- Postal code: 64031
- Dialing code: 0861
- Patron saint: San Nicola da Tolentino
- Saint day: 10 September
- Website: Official website

Arsita is a medieval town and comune in Province of Teramo in the Abruzzo region of eastern Italy. It was called Bacucco until 1905. It is located in Gran Sasso e Monti della Laga National Park.

== Geography ==
Arsita is a communal capital in the Province of Teramo in the Abruzzo Region of Italy. Arsita is located at an elevation of 470 metres (1,540 ft) 36 kilometres (22 mi) from Teramo.

In the early 19th century the waters from a spring in this area were said to have healing powers.

== Events ==
Each year on 17 January, the residents of Arsita, in collaboration with the towns of Cermignano, Tossicia, and Bisenti celebrate the Feast of Saint Antonio Abate. Another festival features the townsfolk dressed up in costumes representing the 12 months of the year.
