= Cellino Attanasio =

- Comune
- Comune di Cellino Attanasio
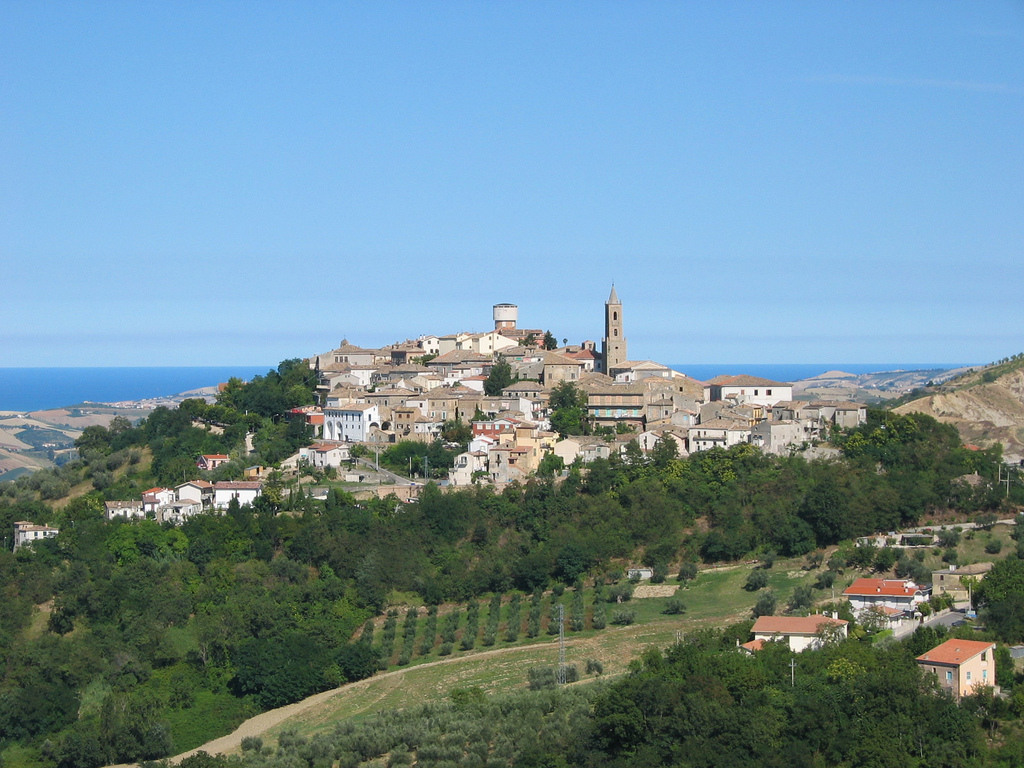

- Coat of arms

- Location within Italy Location within Abruzzo
- Coordinates: 42°35′N 13°52′E
- Country: Italy
- Region: Abruzzo
- Province: Teramo (TE)
- Frazioni: Artemisio, Ciafette, Faiete, Feudi, Luciani, Mammine, Matani, Minghetti, Monteverde, Petrilli, San Clemente, San Martino, San Pietro, Scorrano, Stampalone, Valviano

Government
  - Mayor: Gaetano Zaini

Area
  - Total: 43 km^{2} (17 sq mi)
- Elevation: 443 m (1,453 ft)

Population (1 January 2009)
  - Total: 2,657
  - Density: 62/km^{2} (160/sq mi)
- Demonym: Cellinesi
- Time zone: UTC+1 (CET)
  - Summer (DST): UTC+2 (CEST)
- Postal code: 64036
- Dialing code: 0861
- ISTAT code: 067015
- Website: Official website

Cellino Attanasio is a town and comune in the province of Teramo, Abruzzo, central Italy.
