= Tortoreto =

- Comune
- Comune di Tortoreto
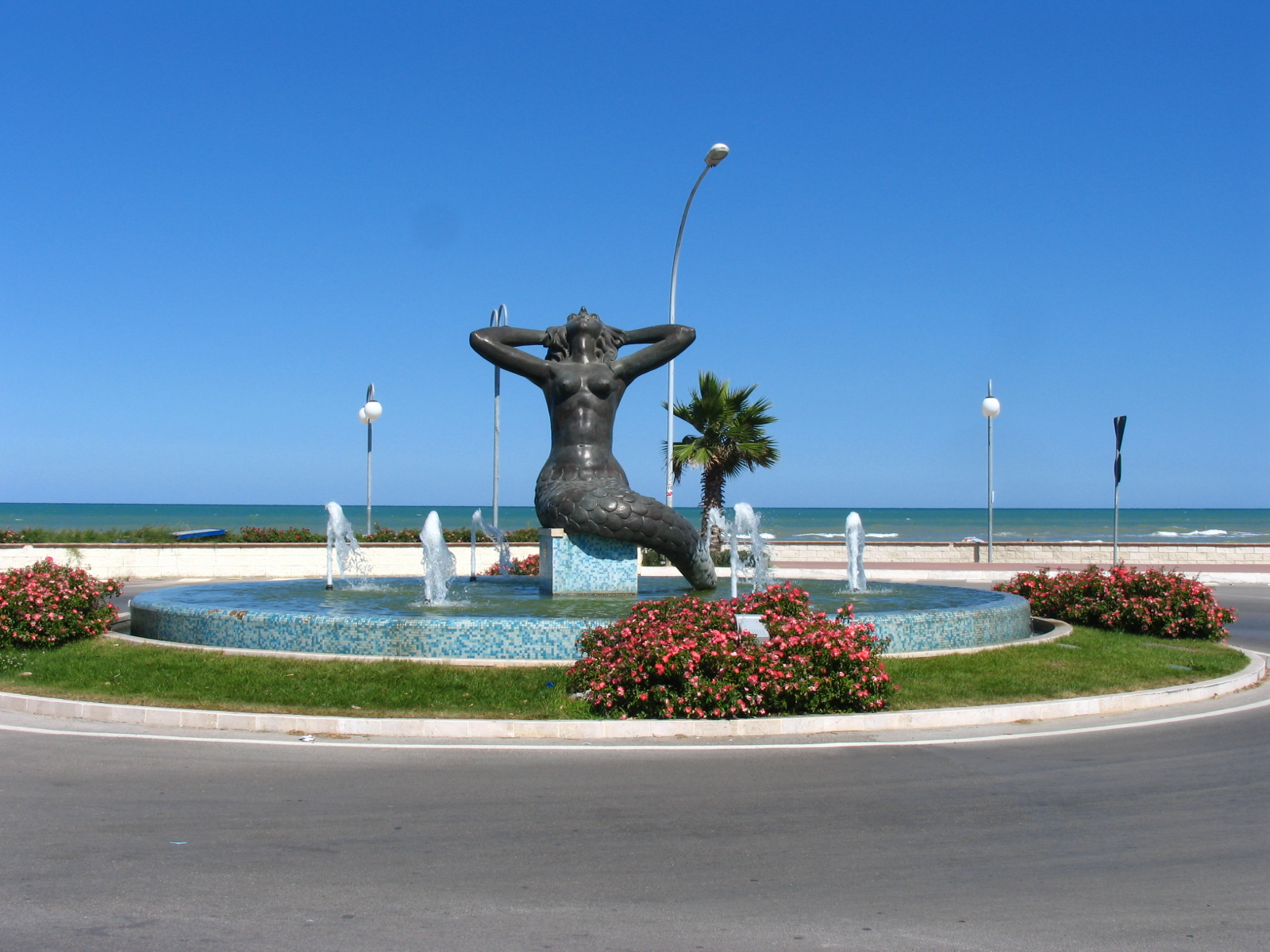
- La Sirena – Statue located at the south end of Tortoreto Lido

- Location within Italy Location within Abruzzo
- Coordinates: 42°48′N 13°55′E
- Country: Italy
- Region: Abruzzo
- Province: Teramo (TE)
- Frazioni: Cavatassi, Colli, Salino, Terrabianca

Government
  - Mayor: Domenico Piccioni (Si Amo Tortoreto; Centre-right)

Area
  - Total: 22.97 km^{2} (8.87 sq mi)
- Elevation: 239 m (784 ft)

Population (31 July 2023)
  - Total: 11,756
  - Density: 511.8/km^{2} (1,326/sq mi)
- Demonym: Tortoretani
- Time zone: UTC+1 (CET)
  - Summer (DST): UTC+2 (CEST)
- Postal code: 64018
- Dialing code: 0861
- Patron saint: San Nicola di Bari
- Saint day: 6 December
- Website: Official website

Tortoreto Italian pronunciation: [tortoˈreto] (Teramano: Tërtërètë) is a coastal town and comune of the province of Teramo in the Abruzzo region of Italy.

It has two distinct parts. The old town is on a hill not far from the Adriatic Sea. The new part, usually referred to as Tortoreto Lido, is seaside and located next to SS 16.

Tortoreto can be reached by direct rail service or by flying to the Pescara airport and then travelling 45 kilometres (28 mi) north.

The comune of Alba Adriatica was created in 1956 by splitting it off from Tortoreto.

== Toponymy ==
The name of the town is due to the large presence of turtle doves (tortore) during the Middle Ages.

Pope Gregory I noticed in a letter the large amount of these species of birds which used to live in this area. Later on, the town created on the top of the hills after the barbarian invasions started to be called Turturitus or Turturetum, and, eventually, the current denomination of Tortoreto came into common use.

== Climate ==
Climate data for Tortoreto. Temperature, precipitation, humidity and sun (last 30 years).
Month	Jan	Feb	Mar	Apr	May	Jun	Jul	Aug	Sep	Oct	Nov	Dec	Year
Mean daily maximum °C (°F)	11 (52)	12 (54)	14 (57)	18 (64)	22 (72)	26 (79)	29 (84)	29 (84)	25 (77)	21 (70)	16 (61)	12 (54)	20 (67)
Mean daily minimum °C (°F)	2 (36)	3 (37)	4 (39)	7 (45)	11 (52)	15 (59)	17 (63)	17 (63)	14 (57)	11 (52)	6 (43)	3 (37)	9 (49)
Average precipitation mm (inches)	55 (2.2)	53 (2.1)	63 (2.5)	55 (2.2)	35 (1.4)	44 (1.7)	34 (1.3)	54 (2.1)	61 (2.4)	74 (2.9)	71 (2.8)	77 (3.0)	676 (26.6)
Average relative humidity (%)	74	73	72	71	72	70	69	71	72	75	76	76	73
Mean daily sunshine hours	3	4	5	6	8	9	10	9	7	6	4	3	6
Source: http://www.ilmeteo.it/portale/medie-climatiche/Tortoreto?refresh_ce

== Education ==
In Tortoreto there are two state primary schools and two state middle schools, which are overall attended by about 680 students, as well as a number of state and private child care institutions and nursery schools.

There are also two private vocational secondary schools.

== Economy ==
During the summer season, the main economic activity is tourism.

Its geographic position, climate, facilities and environmental projects, have all been planned or used to further tourism. Tortoreto has been awarded the European Blue Flag in 1992 and, then, from 1998 until 2023.

Fishing was a common activity in Tortoreto before tourism and it continues on a smaller scale to the present. Another common activity in the area was farming, which produced substantial amounts of olive oil and wheat. This activity continues today on a smaller scale too.

== International relations ==
Tortoreto is twinned with:

- Habay, Belgium
