= Basciano =

- Comune
- Comune di Basciano
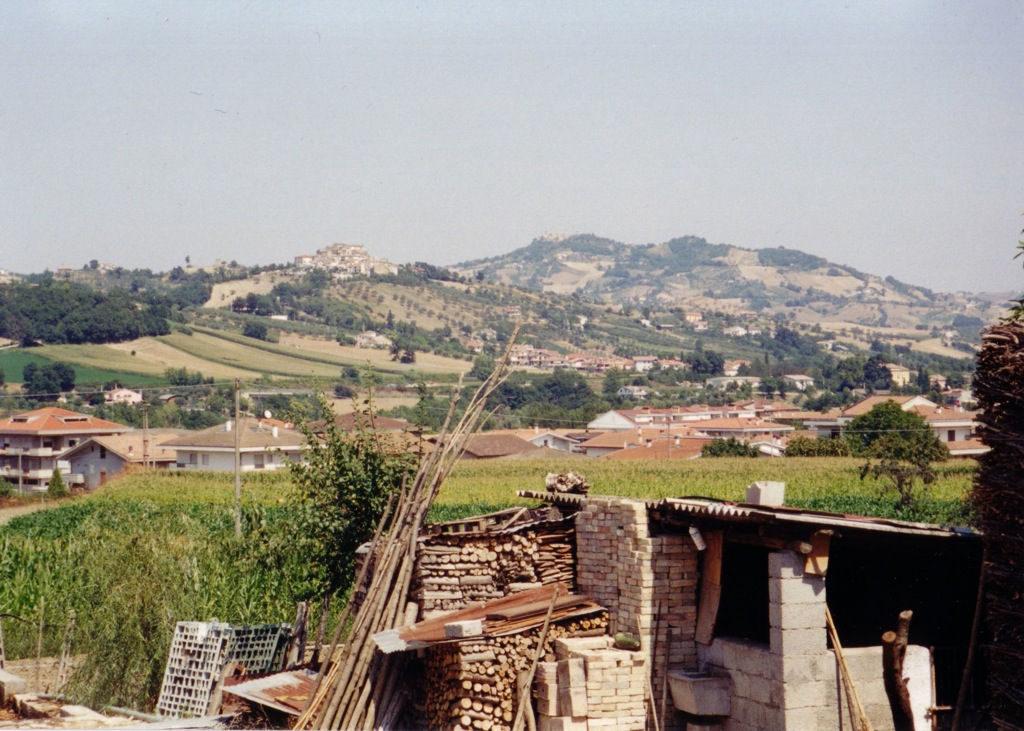

- Coat of arms

- Location within Italy Location within Abruzzo
- Coordinates: 42°36′N 13°44′E
- Country: Italy
- Region: Abruzzo
- Province: Teramo (TE)
- Frazioni: Zampitto, Sant'Agostino, Santa Maria, Tomolati, Feudo, San Rustico

Government
  - Mayor: Paolo Paolini

Area
  - Total: 18.69 km^{2} (7.22 sq mi)
- Elevation: 388 m (1,273 ft)

Population (30 November 2014)
  - Total: 2,431
  - Density: 130.1/km^{2} (336.9/sq mi)
- Demonym: Bascianesi
- Time zone: UTC+1 (CET)
  - Summer (DST): UTC+2 (CEST)
- Postal code: 64030
- Dialing code: 0861
- Patron saint: Saint Flavian
- Saint day: 24 November
- Website: Official website

Basciano is a town and comune in the province of Teramo, located in the Abruzzo region of east central Italy.
