= Castilenti =

- Comune
- Comune di Castilenti
- Location within Italy Location within Abruzzo
- Coordinates: 42°32′N 13°55′E
- Country: Italy
- Region: Abruzzo
- Province: Teramo (TE)
- Frazioni: Casabianca, Colle della Morte, Vicenne, Villa San Romualdo

Area
  - Total: 23 km^{2} (8.9 sq mi)
- Elevation: 272 m (892 ft)

Population (1 January 2007)
  - Total: 1,615
  - Density: 70/km^{2} (180/sq mi)
- Demonym: Castilentesi
- Time zone: UTC+1 (CET)
  - Summer (DST): UTC+2 (CEST)
- Postal code: 64035
- Dialing code: 0861
- ISTAT code: 067014
- Patron saint: Santa Vittoria
- Saint day: 23 December
- Website: Official website

Castilenti (locally Castilinde) is a town and comune in Teramo province in the Abruzzo region of eastern Italy.
