= Fano Adriano =

- Comune
- Comune di Fano Adriano
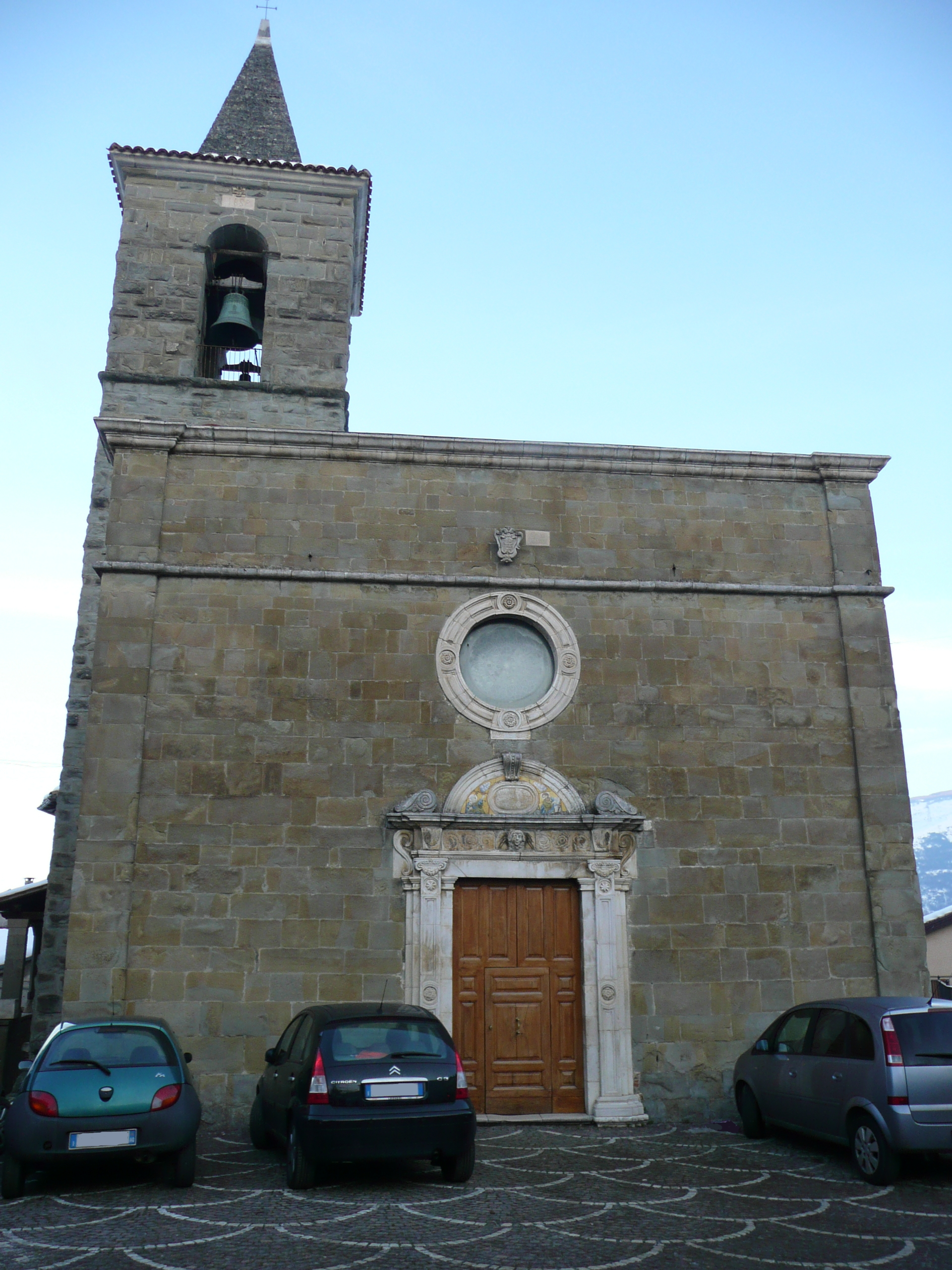
- Church of Sts. Peter and Paul.

- Coat of arms

- Location of Fano Adriano in Italy Fano Adriano (Abruzzo)
- Coordinates: 42°33′14″N 13°32′12″E
- Country: Italy
- Region: Abruzzo
- Province: Teramo (TE)
- Frazioni: Cerqueto, Ponte Rio Arno, Regimenti

Government
  - Mayor: Luigi Servi

Area
  - Total: 35 km^{2} (14 sq mi)
- Elevation: 745 m (2,444 ft)

Population (1 January 2009)
  - Total: 407
  - Density: 12/km^{2} (30/sq mi)
- Demonym: Fanesi
- Time zone: UTC+1 (CET)
  - Summer (DST): UTC+2 (CEST)
- Postal code: 64044
- Dialing code: 0861
- ISTAT code: 067024
- Patron saint: San Valentino
- Saint day: 14 February
- Website: Official website

Fano Adriano is a town and comune in the province of Teramo, part of the Abruzzo region of southeastern Italy. It is located in the natural park known as the "Gran Sasso e Monti della Laga National Park".
