= Montefino =

- Comune
- Comune di Montefino
- Location within Italy Location within Abruzzo
- Coordinates: 42°33′N 13°53′E
- Country: Italy
- Region: Abruzzo
- Province: Teramo
- Frazioni: Bozza, Brecciata, Crocetta Santa Maria, Floriano, Manzitti, Marciano, Muraglie

Government
  - Mayor: Benito Profeta (centre-right) elected 2004-06-13

Area
  - Total: 18.47 km^{2} (7.13 sq mi)
- Elevation: 352 m (1,155 ft)

Population (2001)
  - Total: 1,184
  - Density: 64.10/km^{2} (166.0/sq mi)
- Demonym: Montefinesi
- Time zone: UTC+1 (CET)
  - Summer (DST): UTC+2 (CEST)
- Postal code: 64030
- Dialing code: 0861
- Patron saint: Saint James the Great
- Saint day: July 25

Montefino is a small town and predominantly rural comune of the province of Teramo in the Abruzzo region of eastern Italy. During the second half of the twentieth century the population of the comune declined steadily from 2,399 in 1951 to 1,184—less than half—in 2001.

The town is situated on a hill of some 375 metres (1,230 ft) overlooking the Fino valley where olives and grain are the major crops. Until the 19th century Montefino was called Montesecco (Latin: Mons Siccus) meaning "dry mountain" and referring to a site lacking in springs. In 1863, however, it adopted its current name which refers to the river Fino.

== History ==
The area around Montefino belonged in antiquity to the territory of the Adriatic Sabini, and later to that of the Roman colonia Hatria Picena, modern Atri. Little is known, however, of any settlement here until around 1150, with the mention of a castellum Montis Sicci with around 65 inhabitants belonging to the County of Penne.

In 1454 Mons Siccus become a fief of the Acquaviva of Atri who restored the defensive walls of the town and constructed a new castle. By 1506 the town had come into the possession of the bishops of Teramo.

== Economy ==
A majority of the population works in industry. It is a traditionally agricultural area, but work dedicated to the breeding of animals and agriculture is in decline.

== Main sights ==
The old fortress, or Castello di Corte, whose Norman form and features are still recognizable, occupies the highest part of the town. On the terraces below this developed the later medieval town, with a second castle, the Castello degli Acquaviva, and an eighteenth-century church dedicated to Saint James the Great, the Chiesa di San Giacomo Apostolo, whose fabric includes an external portal of the sixteenth century recovered from an abandoned abbey nearby.

== Events ==
The Feast of Saint James is celebrated on 25 July. Also in July is the annual olive oil festival, or Sagra dell'olio.

== Sources ==
Basic data on population, mayor, location, elevation, etc.:

- The corresponding article on the Italian Wikipedia (in Italian)
- http://www.comuni-italiani.it/067/027 (in Italian), and linked pages
- https://web.archive.org/web/20061028074157/http://abruzzo2000.com/genealogy/archives/te_comunifrazioni.htm (in Italian)
- http://www.paesionline.it/abruzzo/montefino/comune_montefino.asp (in Italian) (patron saint)

History and monuments:

- Itinerari di conoscenza tra opere e natura nelle Montagne Teramane (in Italian) Documentation centre for the mountains of the Province of Teramo

General:

- www.montefino.org (in Italian) a website devoted to the village
- (in Italian) Tourist information office
- http://www.abruzzocitta.it/comuni/montefino.html (in Italian)
