= Castiglione Messer Raimondo =

- Comune
- Comune di Castiglione Messer Raimondo
- Coat of arms

- Location within Italy Location within Abruzzo
- Coordinates: 42°32′N 13°53′E
- Country: Italy
- Region: Abruzzo
- Province: Teramo (TE)
- Frazioni: Appignano, Borea Santa Maria, Bozzano, Cesi, Colletrimarino, Piane, San Giorgio, Vorghe

Government
  - Mayor: Danilo Crescia

Area
  - Total: 30 km^{2} (12 sq mi)
- Elevation: 306 m (1,004 ft)

Population (1 January 2009)
  - Total: 2,398
  - Density: 80/km^{2} (210/sq mi)
- Demonym: Castiglionesi
- Time zone: UTC+1 (CET)
  - Summer (DST): UTC+2 (CEST)
- Postal code: 64034
- Dialing code: 0861
- Patron saint: San Donato Martire
- Saint day: 7 August
- Website: Official website

Castiglione Messer Raimondo (locally Castiùne) is a town and comune in the province of Teramo, Abruzzo, central Italy.

It is a medieval borough near the Gran Sasso d'Italia massif. Economy is mostly based on agriculture.
