= Cermignano =

- Comune
- Comune di Cermignano
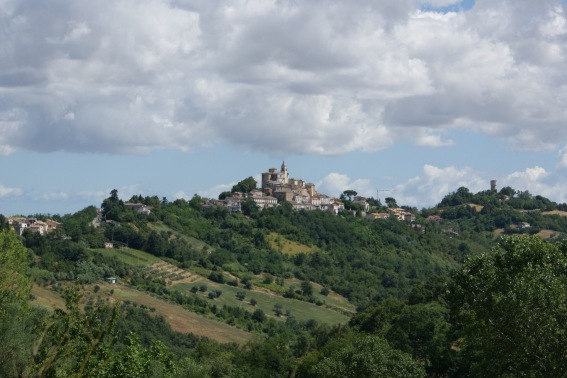

- Location within Italy Location within Abruzzo
- Coordinates: 42°35′N 13°48′E
- Country: Italy
- Region: Abruzzo
- Province: Teramo (TE)
- Frazioni: Carbone, Casamarano, Casavino, Montegualtieri, Petriola, Piomba, Poggio delle Rose, Saputelli, Topetti, Villa Compagni, Villa Santa Maria

Area
  - Total: 26 km^{2} (10 sq mi)
- Elevation: 563 m (1,847 ft)

Population (31 December 2006)
  - Total: 1,881
  - Density: 72/km^{2} (190/sq mi)
- Demonym: Cermignanesi
- Time zone: UTC+1 (CET)
  - Summer (DST): UTC+2 (CEST)
- Postal code: 64037
- Dialing code: 0861
- ISTAT code: 067016
- Patron saint: San Silvestro
- Saint day: 31 December

Cermignano (locally Cirmignanë) is a town and comune in the province of Teramo in the Abruzzo region of eastern Italy.
