= Province of Teramo =

Coordinates: 42°39′31″N 13°42′09″E

Province of Teramo Provincia di Teramo (Italian) Pruvìngie de Tèreme (Abruzzese)
- Province
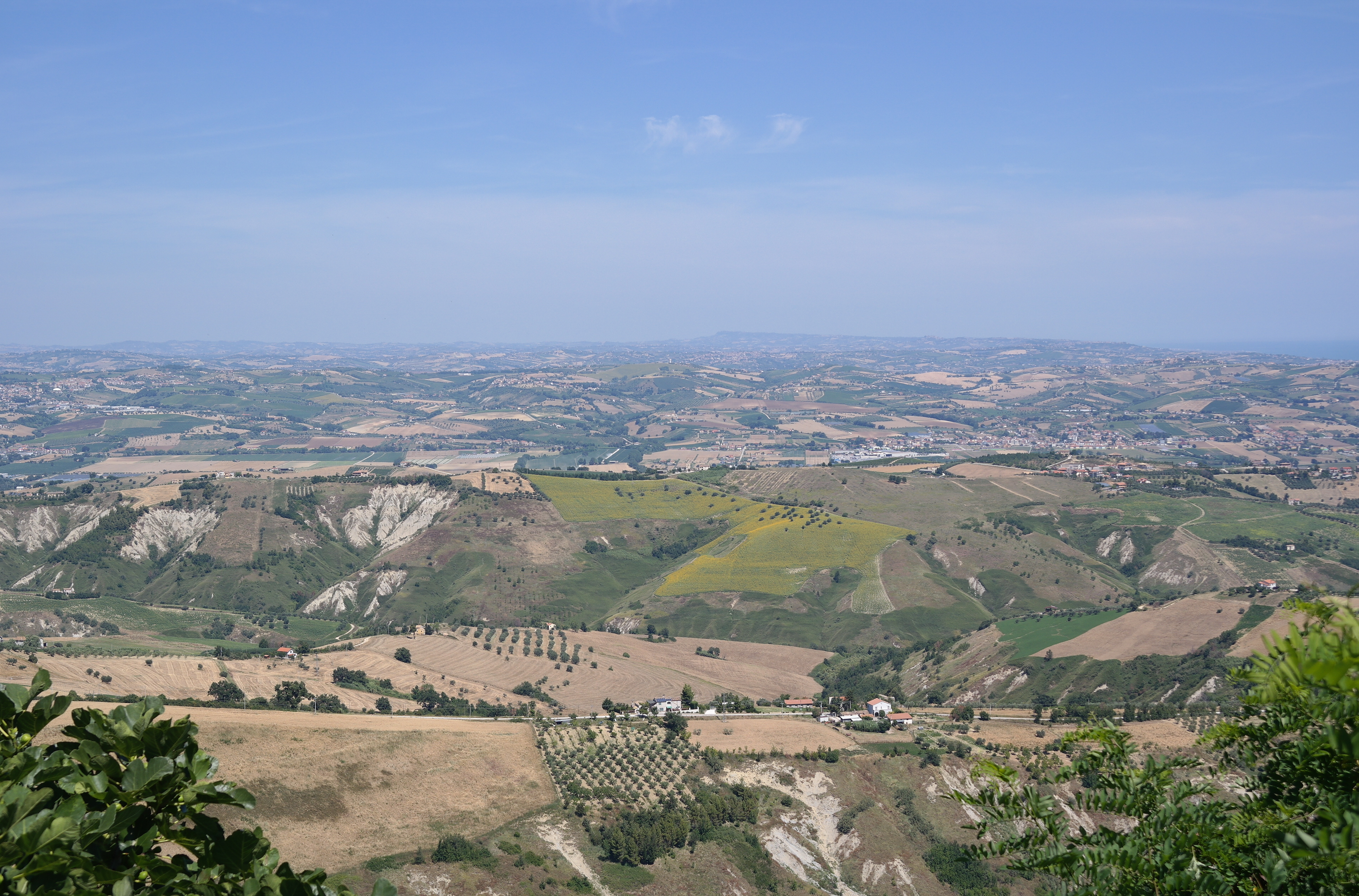
- Teramo mainlain seen from Atri

- Coat of arms

- Location of the province of Teramo in Italy
- Country: Italy
- Region: Abruzzo
- Capital(s): Teramo
- Municipalities: 47

Government
  - President: Camillo D'Angelo

Area
  - Total: 1,954.38 km^{2} (754.59 sq mi)

Population (2026)
  - Total: 299,835
  - Density: 153.417/km^{2} (397.348/sq mi)

GDP
  - Total: €7.093 billion (2015)
  - Per capita: €22,825 (2015)
- Time zone: UTC+1 (CET)
  - Summer (DST): UTC+2 (CEST)
- Postal code: 64100
- Telephone prefix: 0861
- Vehicle registration: TE
- ISTAT code: 067

The Province of Teramo (Italian: provincia di Teramo; Abruzzese: pruvìngie de Tèreme) is a province in the region of Abruzzo in southern Italy. Its capital is the city of Teramo. The province has a population of 299,835 in an area of 1,954.38 square kilometres (754.59 mi^{2}) across its 47 municipalities.

The province of Teramo borders the province of Ascoli Piceno in the region of Marche to the north, the province of L'Aquila still in the region of Abruzzo to the south and southwest, and the province of Rieti in the region of Lazio to the west. To the south is the province of Pescara in the Abruzzo region and to the east is the Adriatic Sea.

== Geography ==
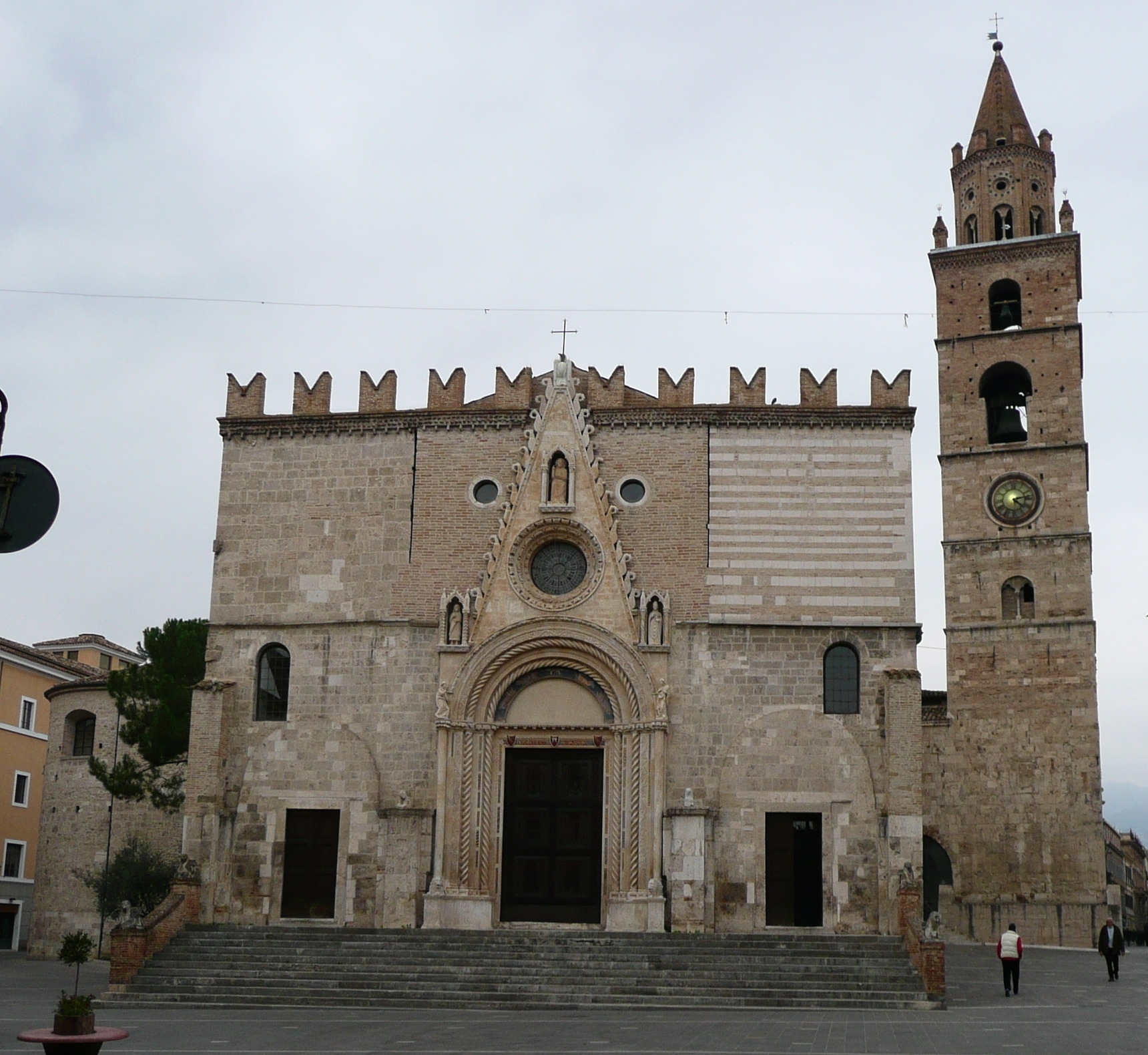
Teramo Cathedral

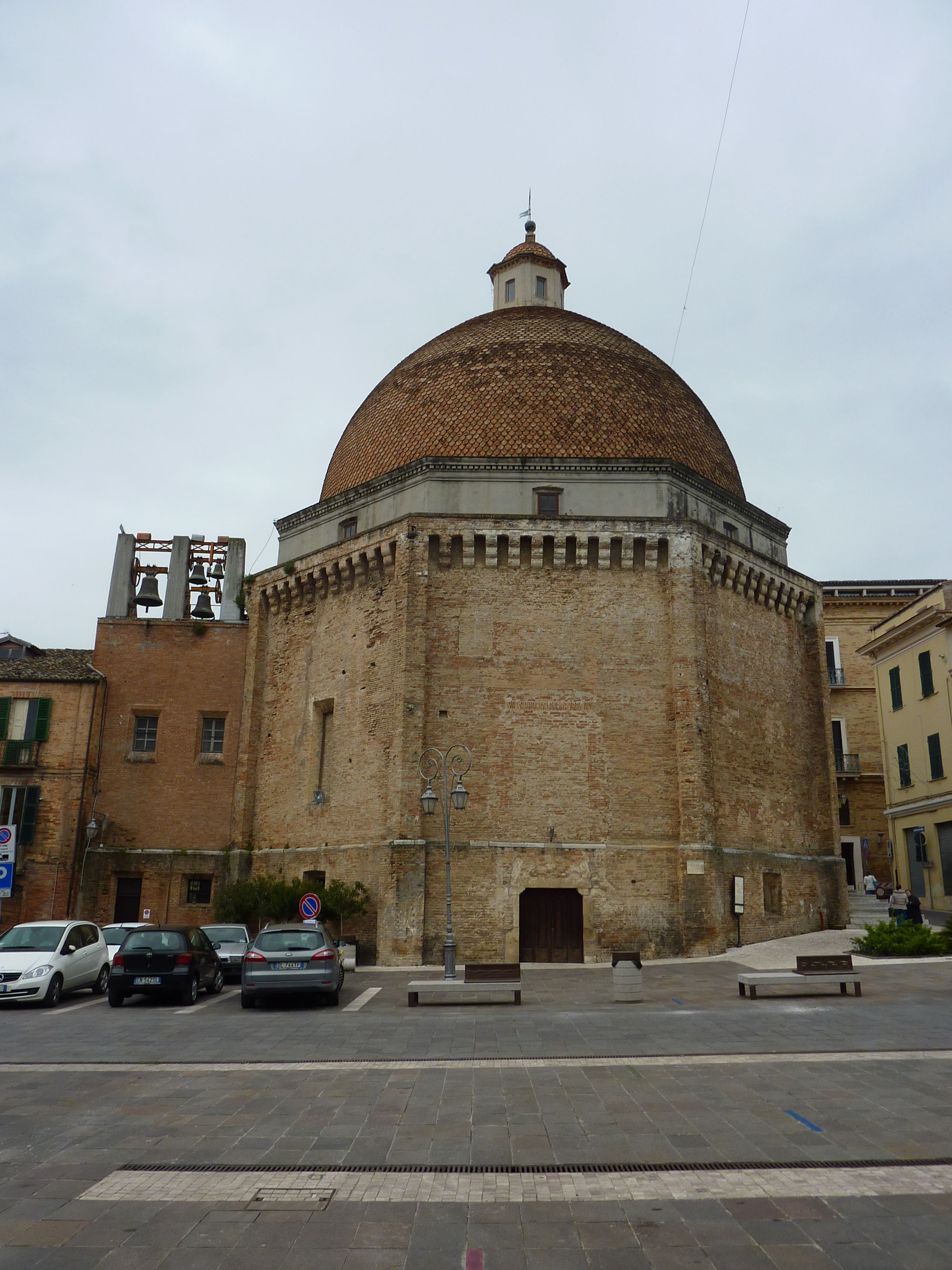
Giulianova's renaissance dome

The landscape of the Province of Teramo is dominated almost entirely on the east by a large body of water with the beaches of the Adriatic Sea and by the Apennine Mountains which his highest peak of Gran Sasso d'Italia westside. The province is indeed divided latitudinally by the characteristic hills and valleys rich in vineyards and olive groves that begin in the Apennines and run almost to the coast. Colline Teramane (Teramo Hills) has become a trademark and are one of the most significant areas where extra virgin olive oil and Abruzzo wines are produced. Unique of the province of Teramo is the short distance between the beaches of the Adriatic Sea and the 3,000-metre (9,800 ft) snowcapped Gran Sasso peaks. They can be reached within an hour from one point to the other. The peaks of the Gran Sasso rise to the west of the Province of Teramo while those of the Monti della Laga dominate its northern border. These two ridges are among the most distinctive and the most relevant of the entire Apennine Mountain range. The majestic Gran Sasso rises at its peak, the Corno Grande, to an elevation of 2,912 metres (9,554 ft) and is characterized by steep, and in places virtually inaccessible, gorges with nature reserves and protected living species. A good part of Gran Sasso and Monti della Laga National Park is nestled in the province. Calderone, the southernmost glacier in Continental European, is found nearby. In contrast to the rugged and isolated Gran Sasso area, the Monti della Laga are characterised by thick forests, shallow gorges, rolling slopes and valleys, and several spectacular waterfalls. In addition to the provincial capital, the most populous and important commercial centers include Roseto degli Abruzzi and Giulianova with populations of 25,000 and 24,000 inhabitants respectively. On the eastern portion of the province are the so-called "seven sister" beaches directly adjacent to the Adriatic Sea. These resorts are noted for one of the highest blue flag beaches density, very fine white sand and their mild and wholesome Mediterranean climates which support a rich flora of palm, pine and oleander trees. Much of the province is hilly and very few large flat plains are to be found. Running from the west to the east are a number of valley streams and rivers which eventually empty into the Adriatic Sea. The province of Teramo can easily be reached by car or bus from Rome via the A24 highway and it is also connected to the A14 highway.

== Government ==
=== List of presidents ===
The president of the province is Camillo D'Angelo since 29 January 2023.

=== Municipalities ===
The province has 47 municipalities:

- Alba Adriatica
- Ancarano
- Arsita
- Atri
- Basciano
- Bellante
- Bisenti
- Campli
- Canzano
- Castel Castagna
- Castellalto
- Castelli
- Castiglione Messer Raimondo
- Castilenti
- Cellino Attanasio
- Cermignano
- Civitella del Tronto
- Colledara
- Colonnella
- Controguerra
- Corropoli
- Cortino
- Crognaleto
- Fano Adriano
- Giulianova
- Isola del Gran Sasso d'Italia
- Martinsicuro
- Montefino
- Montorio al Vomano
- Morro d'Oro
- Mosciano Sant'Angelo
- Nereto
- Notaresco
- Penna Sant'Andrea
- Pietracamela
- Pineto
- Rocca Santa Maria
- Roseto degli Abruzzi
- Sant'Egidio alla Vibrata
- Sant'Omero
- Silvi
- Teramo
- Torano Nuovo
- Torricella Sicura
- Tortoreto
- Tossicia
- Valle Castellana

== Demographics ==
Historical population
Year	Pop.	±%
1861	150,296	—
1871	159,832	+6.3%
1881	167,415	+4.7%
1901	204,804	+22.3%
1911	213,061	+4.0%
1921	218,757	+2.7%
1931	236,030	+7.9%
1936	249,532	+5.7%
1951	272,103	+9.0%
1961	260,687	−4.2%
1971	257,080	−1.4%
1981	269,275	+4.7%
1991	279,852	+3.9%
2001	287,411	+2.7%
2011	306,349	+6.6%
2021	299,646	−2.2%
Source: ISTAT

As of 2026, the population is 299,835, of which 49.3% are male, and 50.7% are female. Minors make up 14.0% of the population, and seniors make up 25.8%.

=== Immigration ===
As of 2025, immigrants make up 13.7% of the population. The 5 largest foreign countries of birth are Albania, Switzerland, Romania, Venezuela, and Morocco.

== Culture ==
Towns in the province of Teramo include Civitella del Tronto and Atri. The first stood as the northernmost protective point of the Kingdom of the Two Sicilies. In Atri there is a Roman Catholic cathedral and a theatre. The provincial capital of Teramo hosts a large cathedral and has for centuries served all of Abruzzo as a main administrative and economic center.

On 15 September 2005 the President of Italy, Carlo Azeglio Ciampi, went to Teramo to make a special presentation in honour of the resistance movement that arose in this town against the Nazi forces during the Second World War. A special note was made of the young Italian partisans who gathered in the village of Bosco Martese. There they risked deportation, severe reprisals, and other barbarous acts.

== Tourism ==
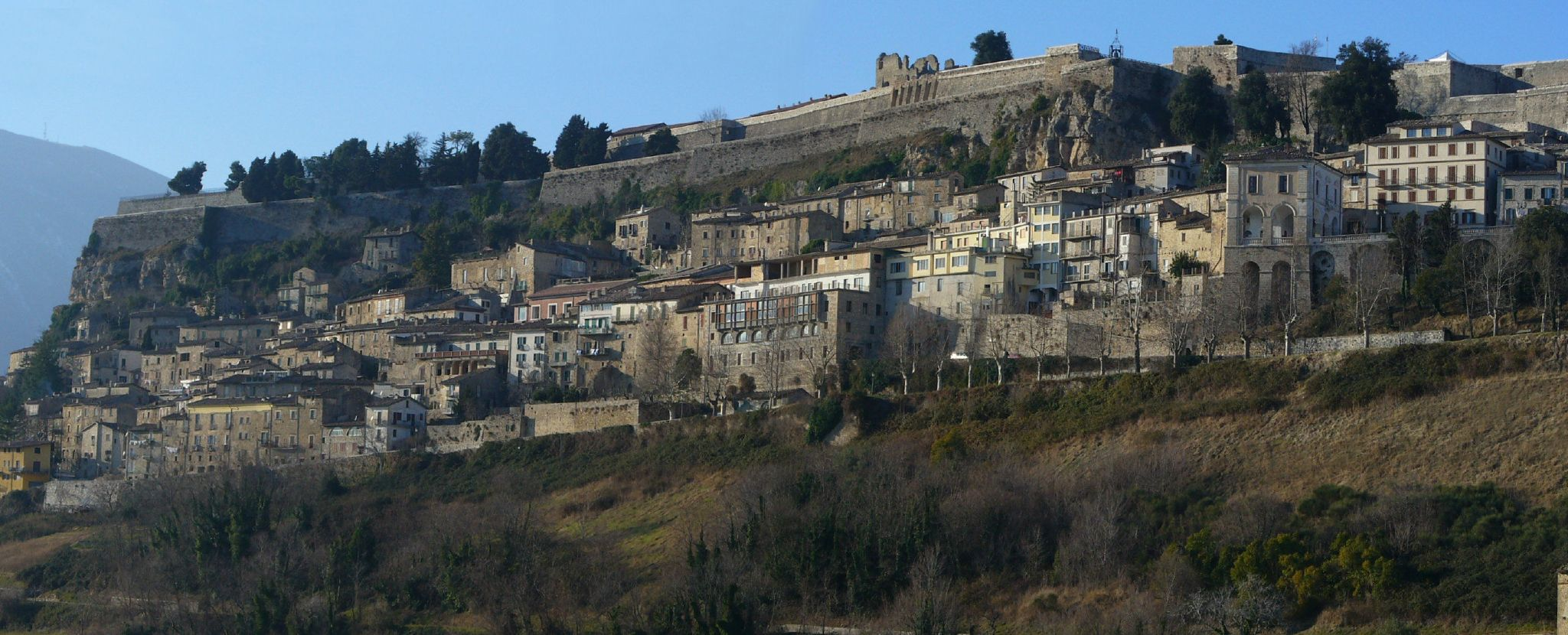
The town and fortress of Civitella del Tronto.

Main tourist attractions include:

- Atri, including an erosion phenomenon called "Bolge" and see the treasures of the Count of Aquaviva.
- Campli – a characteristic village once possession of the Farnese Family. Its St Paul Church holds a Scala Sancta.
- Castelli is a village 40 kilometres (25 miles) from Teramo. It is known for its maiolicas. In the past local artisans produced ceramics for most of the royal houses of Europe.
- Civitella del Tronto – Bourbon fortress which is the most visited monument of the Abruzzo region, surrounding village e and gole del Salinello. The place holds a significant importance in the history of Italy unification.
- Colline Teramane (Teramo hills) are a very distinctive and significant area where extra virgin olive oil and Abruzzo wines are produced.
- Giulianova – an example of renaissance ideal city on the Adriatic Sea founded by Giulio Antonio Acquaviva.
- Monti Gemelli (Twin Mountains) of the Gran Sasso and Monti della Laga National Park are two suggestive mountains standing alongside. They are often taken as one of the symbols of the province of Teramo.
- Montorio al Vomano – historical medieval town and its cathedral.
- Teramo – cathedral and museums.
- Gran Sasso and Monti della Laga National Park.
- The Shrine of Gabriel of Our Lady of Sorrows with average of two million visitors per year is one of the 15 most visited sanctuaries in the world.

From north to south, the province of Teramo boasts several blue flag beaches on the Adriatric Seacoast, called the seven sisters, are the following:

- Martinsicuro
- Alba Adriatica
- Tortoreto
- Giulianova
- Roseto degli Abruzzi
- Pineto
- Silvi Marina

This coast tractor is called Costa Giardino.

== Transport ==
=== Major highways ===
The Province of Teramo can be reached from the north and the south by the main highway, the A14, that runs along the Adriatic Coast. It can be reached from the west by the A24 coming from Rome via L'Aquila.

=== Railroad lines ===
The central railroad station of the province is located in Giulianova. From here is it possible to follow the coastline to the north and south or to travel in a westerly direction towards the provincial capital.

=== Seaports ===
The port of Giulianova is the maritime terminal of the Province of Teramo.

== Gallery ==
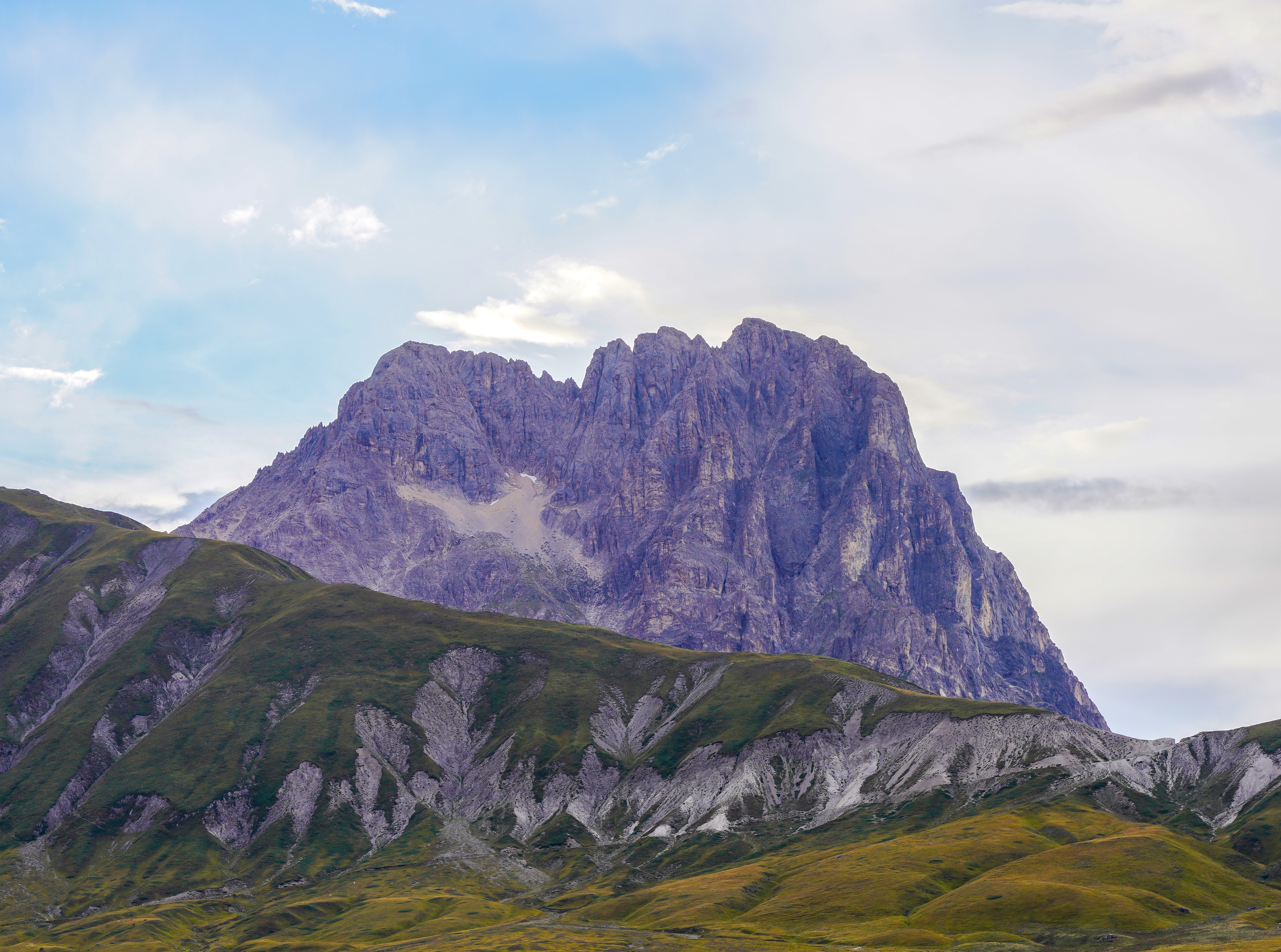
Corno Grande of Gran Sasso d'Italia

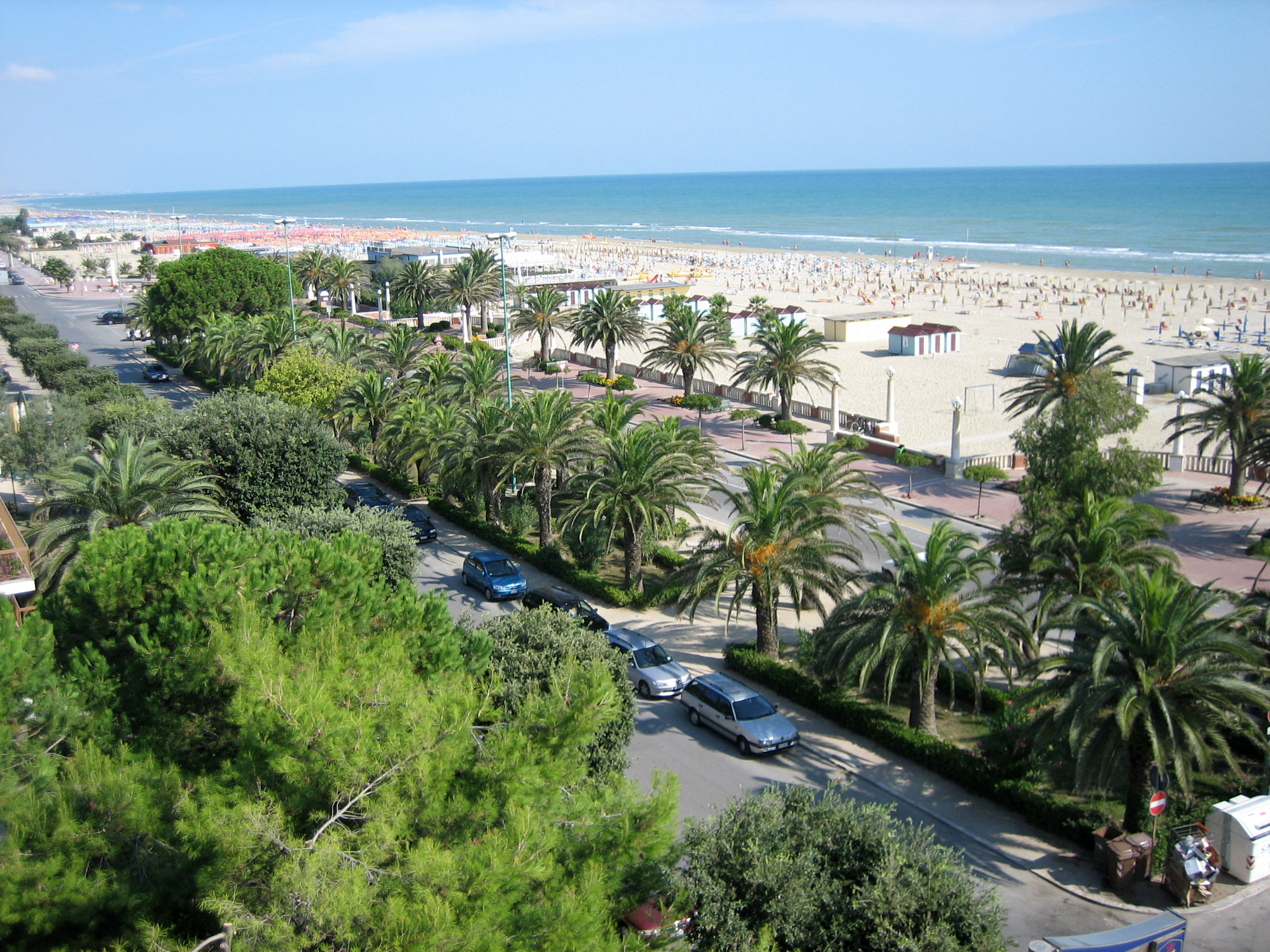
Giulianova seaside

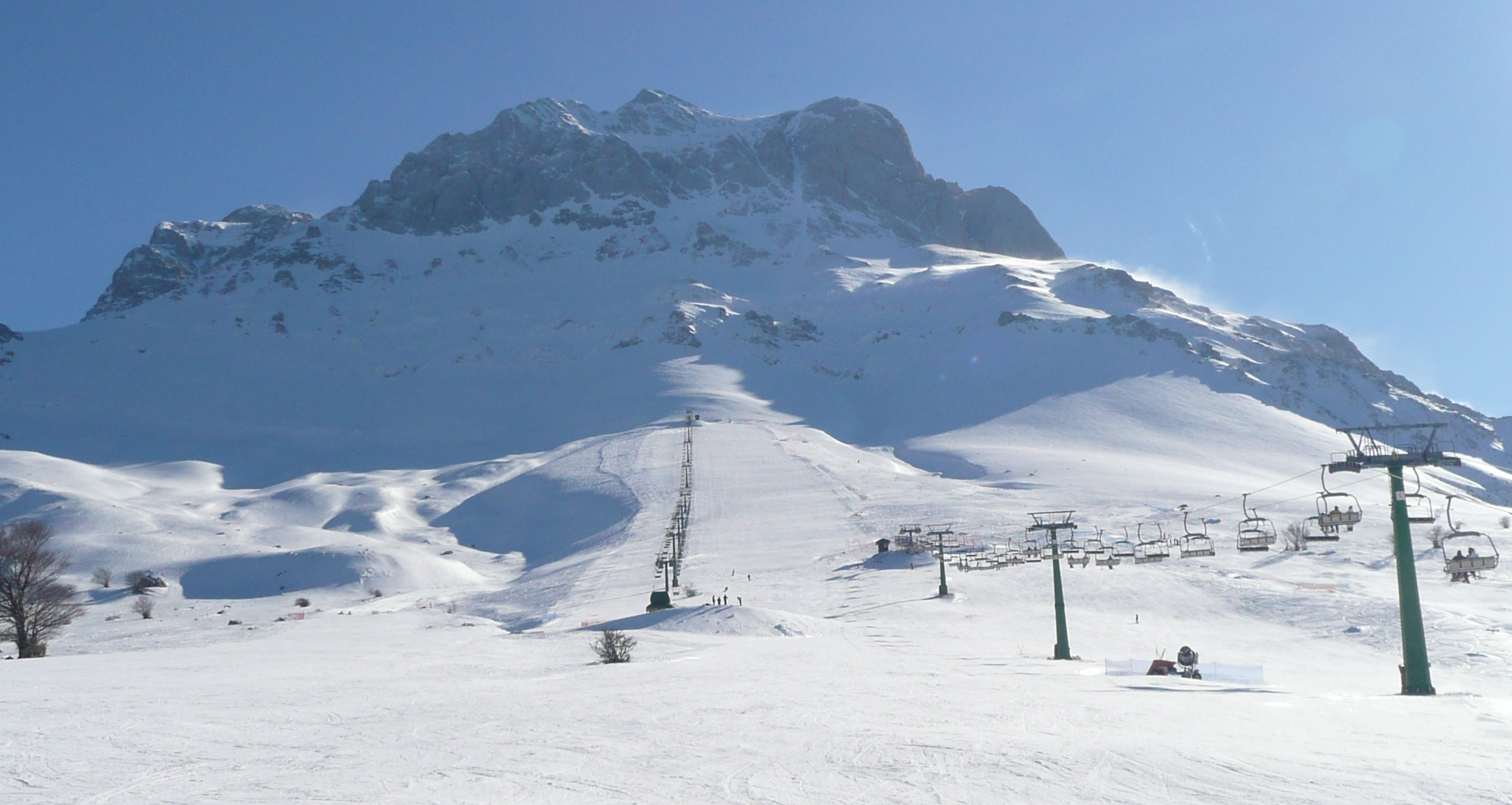
Prati di Tivo ski slopes

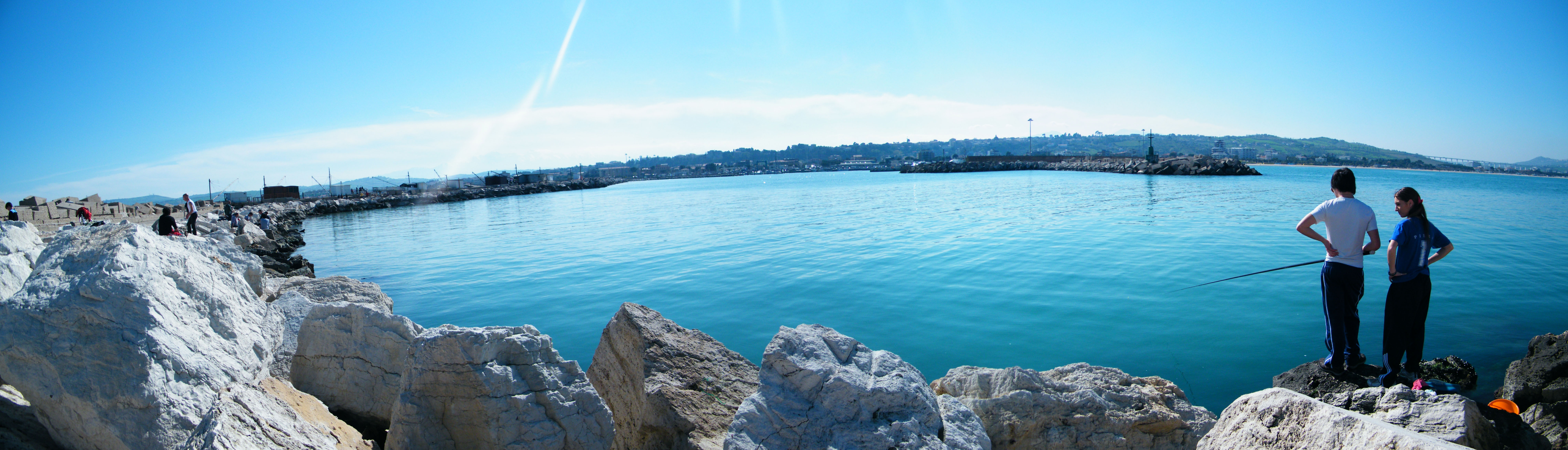
Giulianova

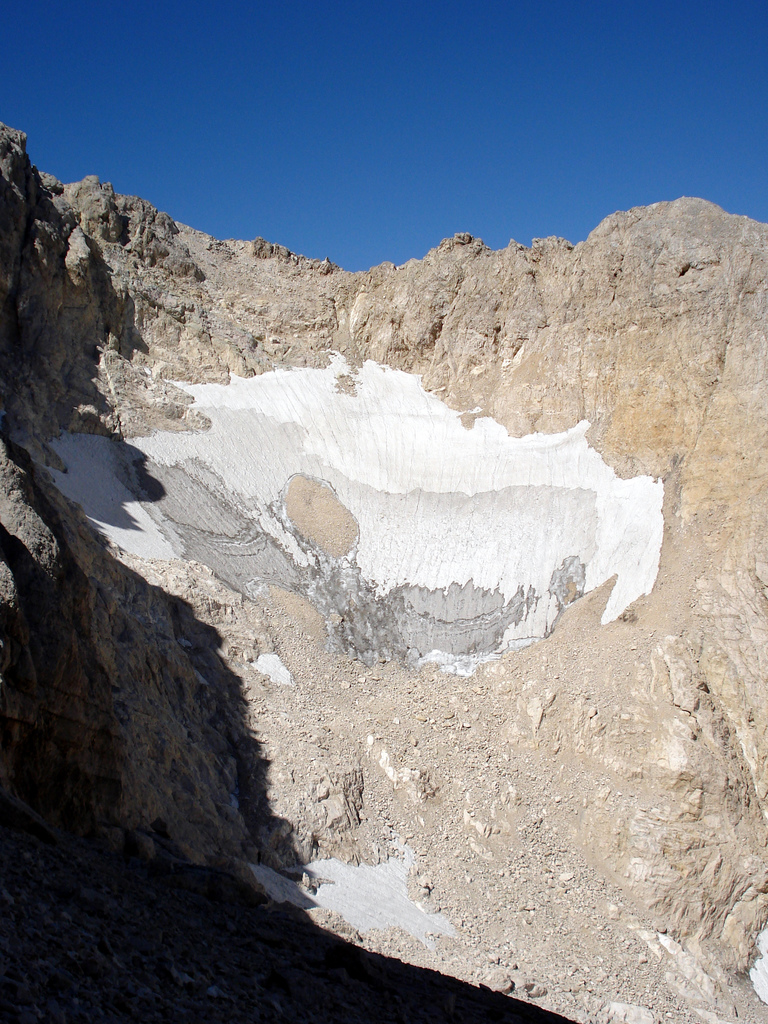
Calderone glacier

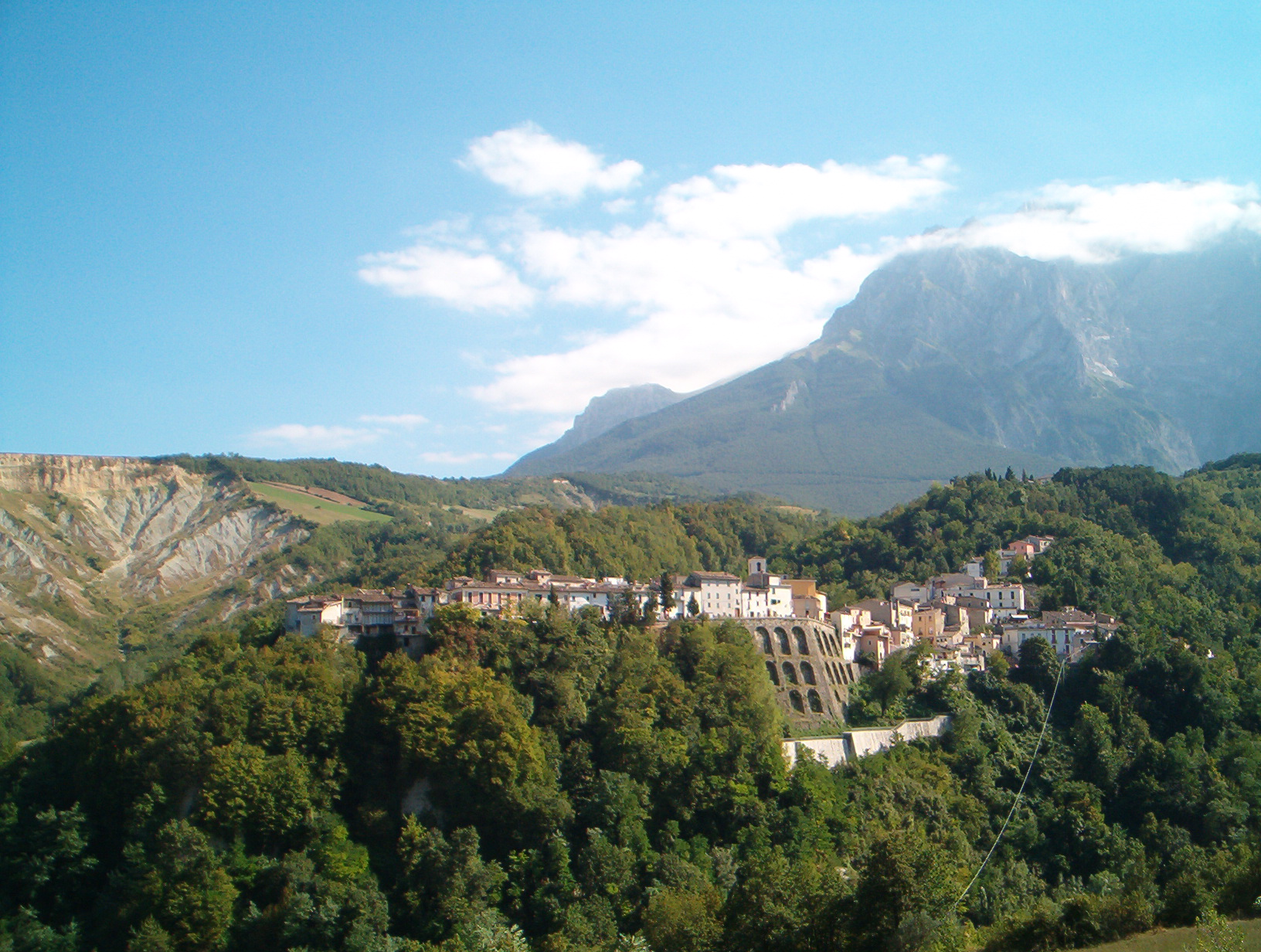
Castelli

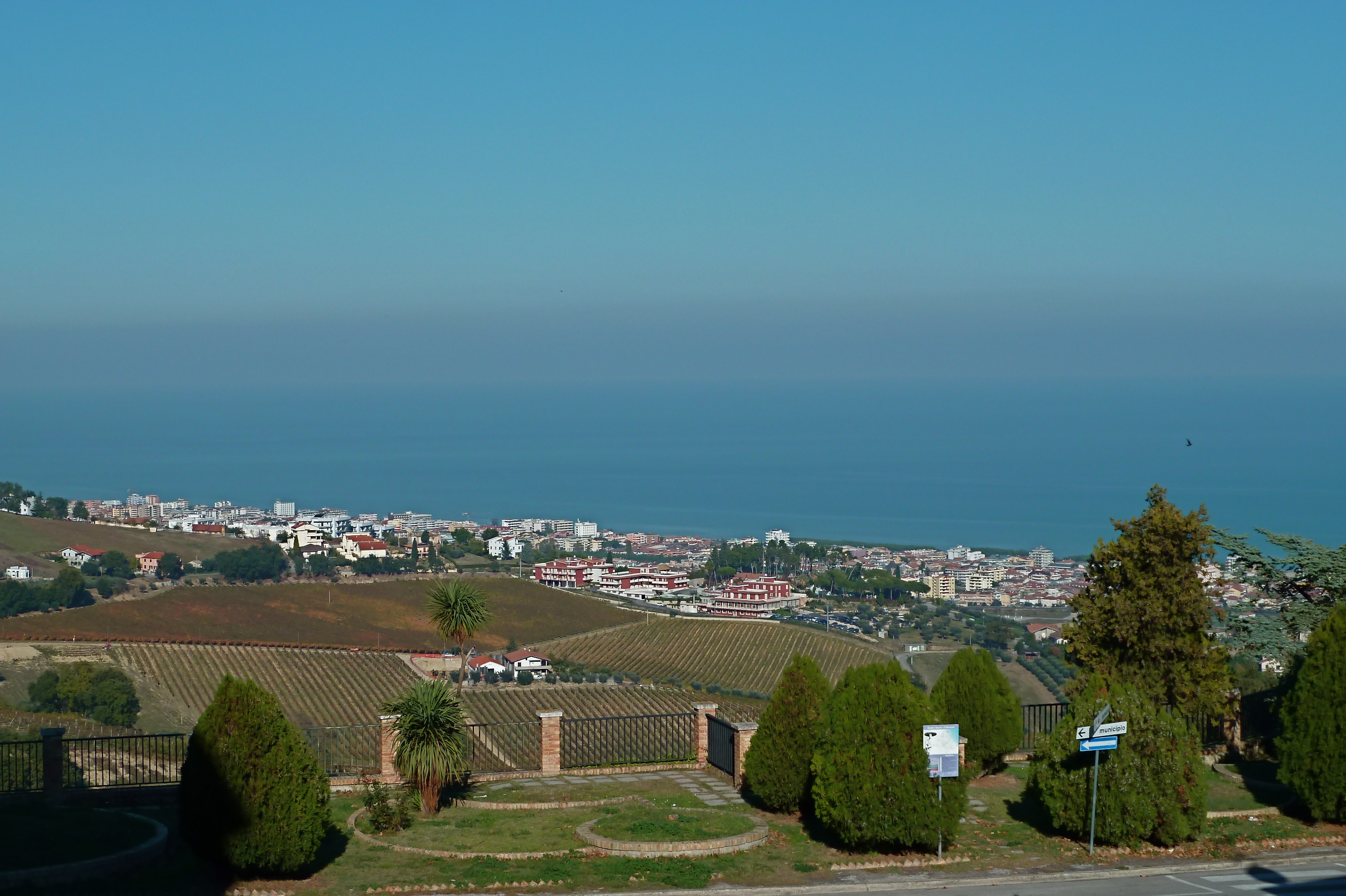
Coast

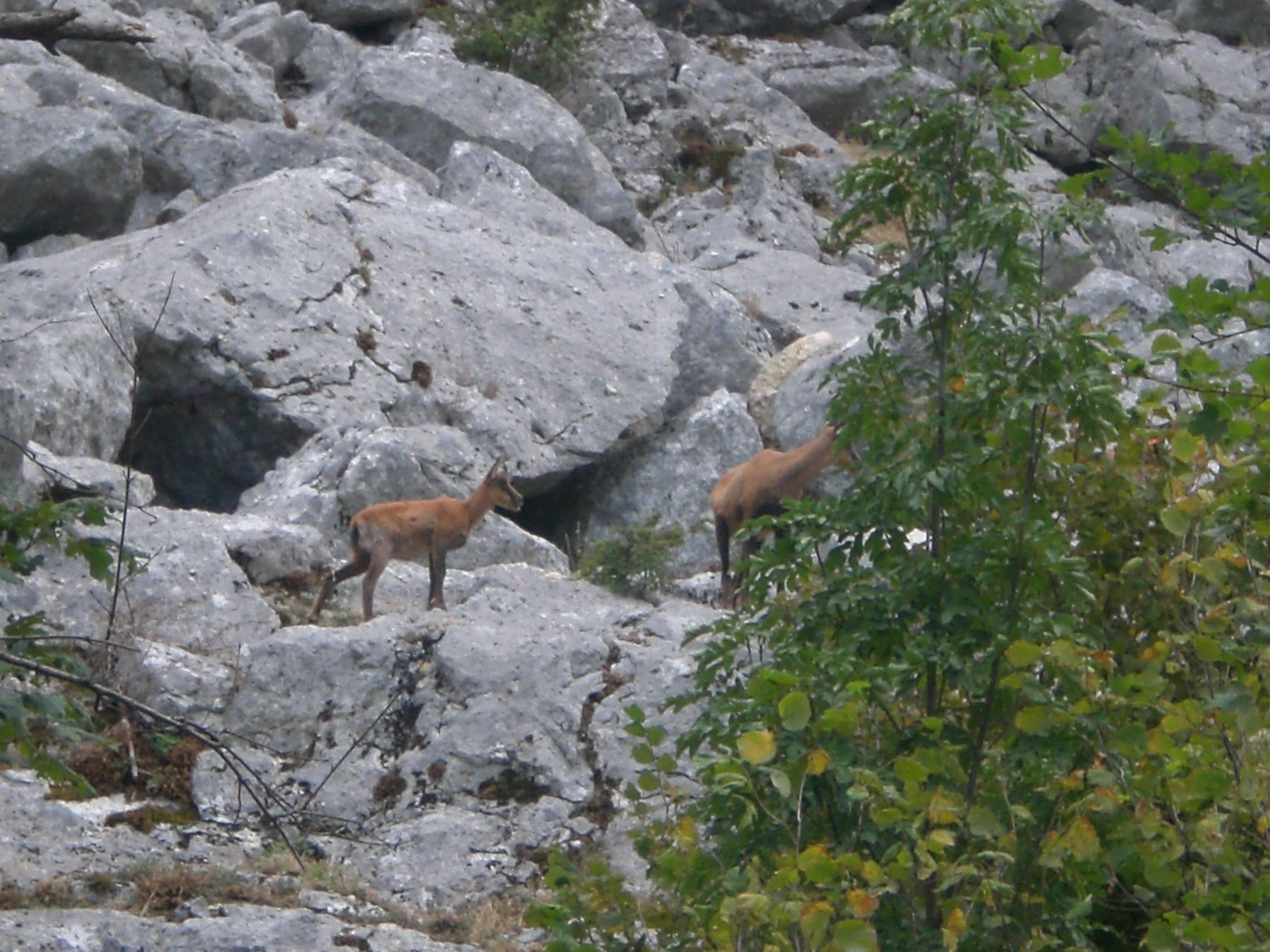
Abruzzo chamois

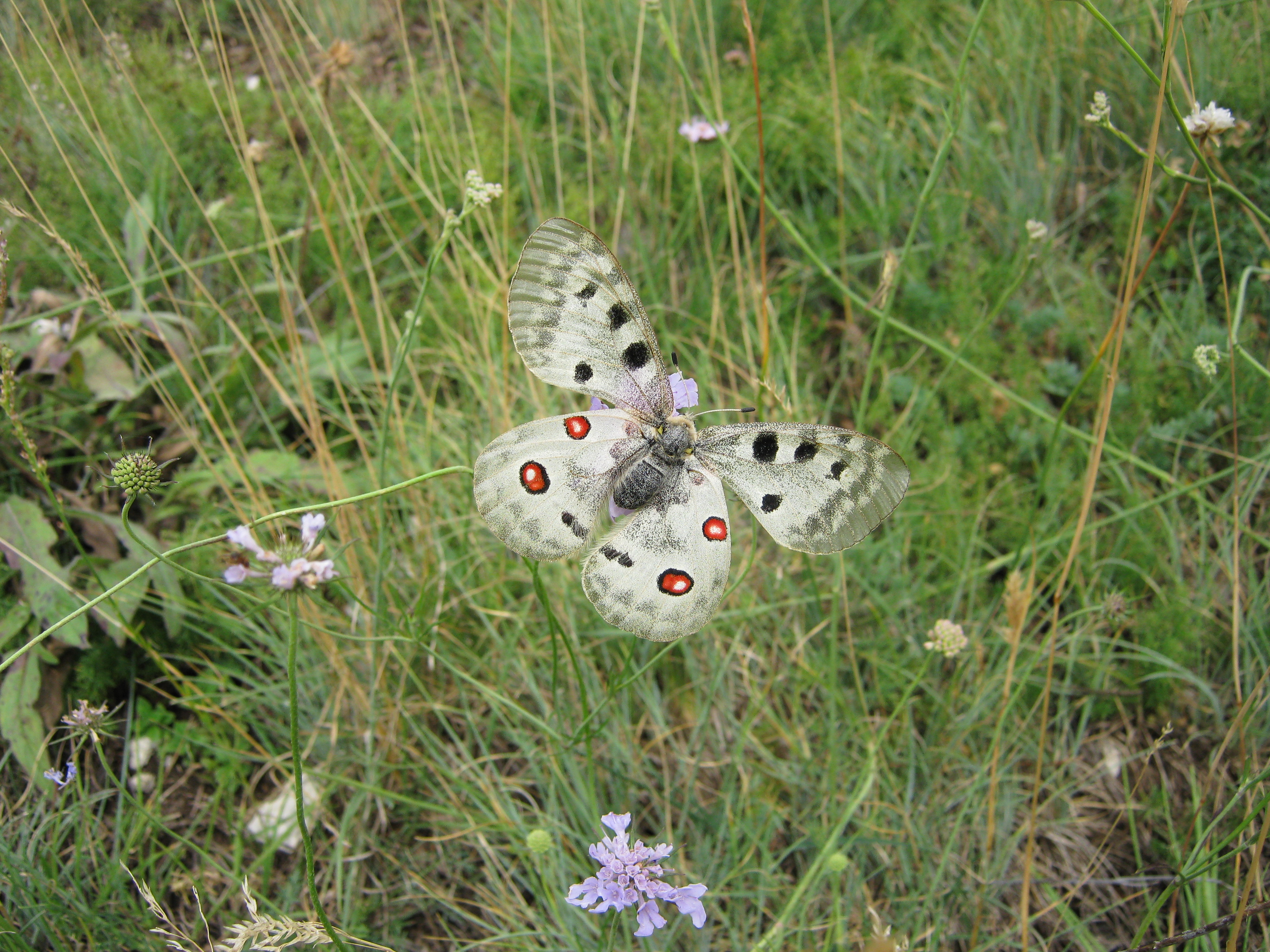
Apollo Butterfly in Gran Sasso d'Italia

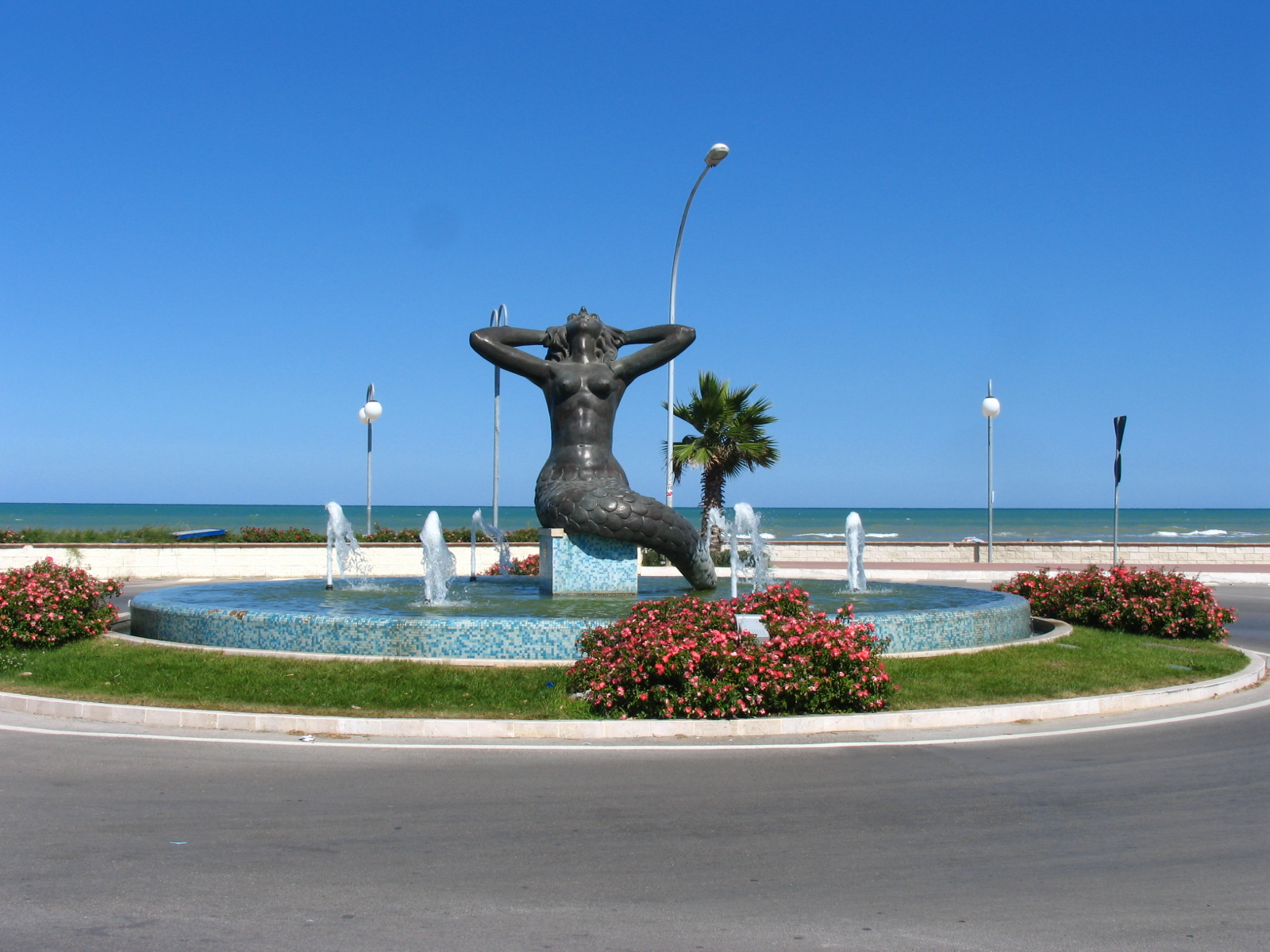
Tortoreto seaside

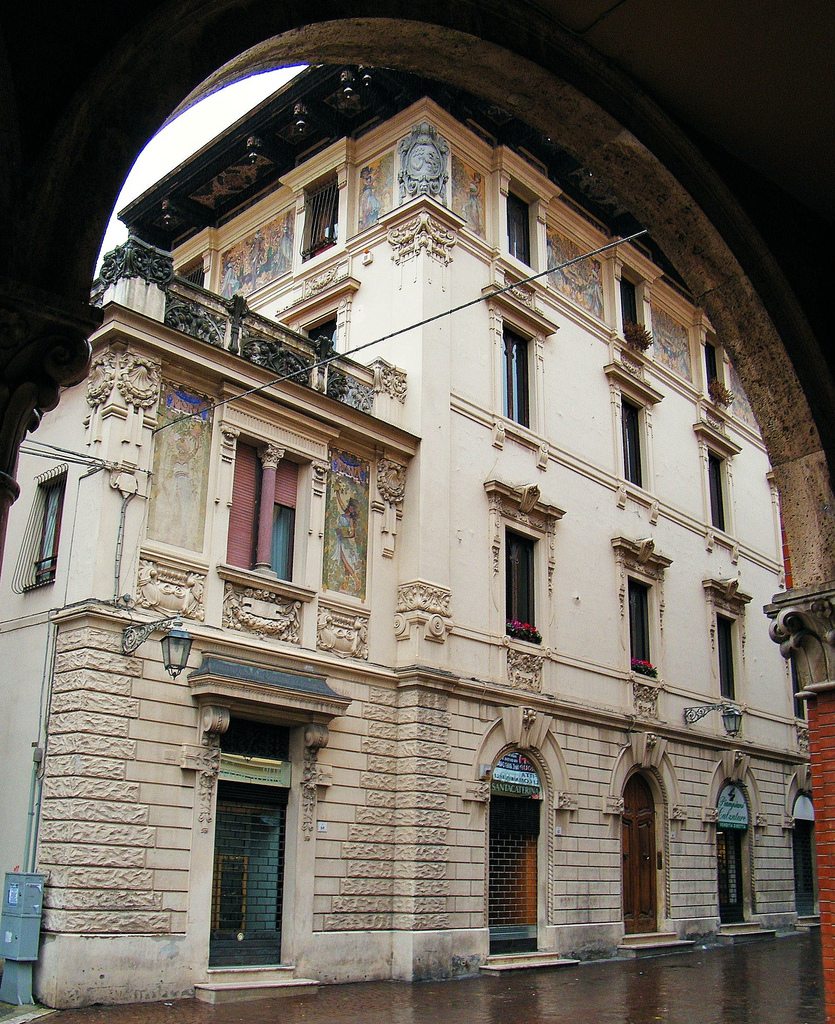
Teramo

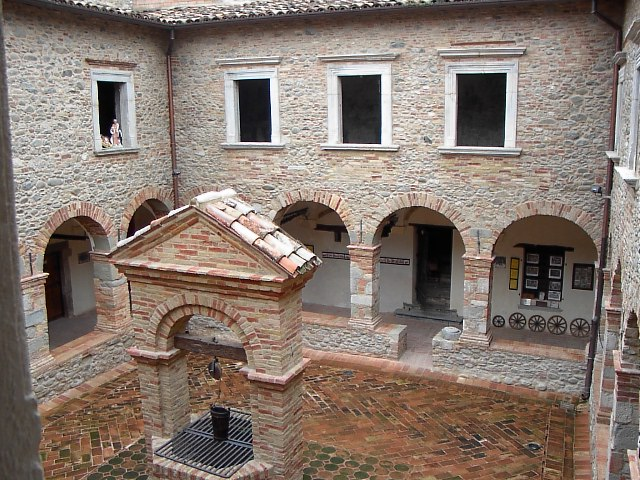
Montorio al Vomano

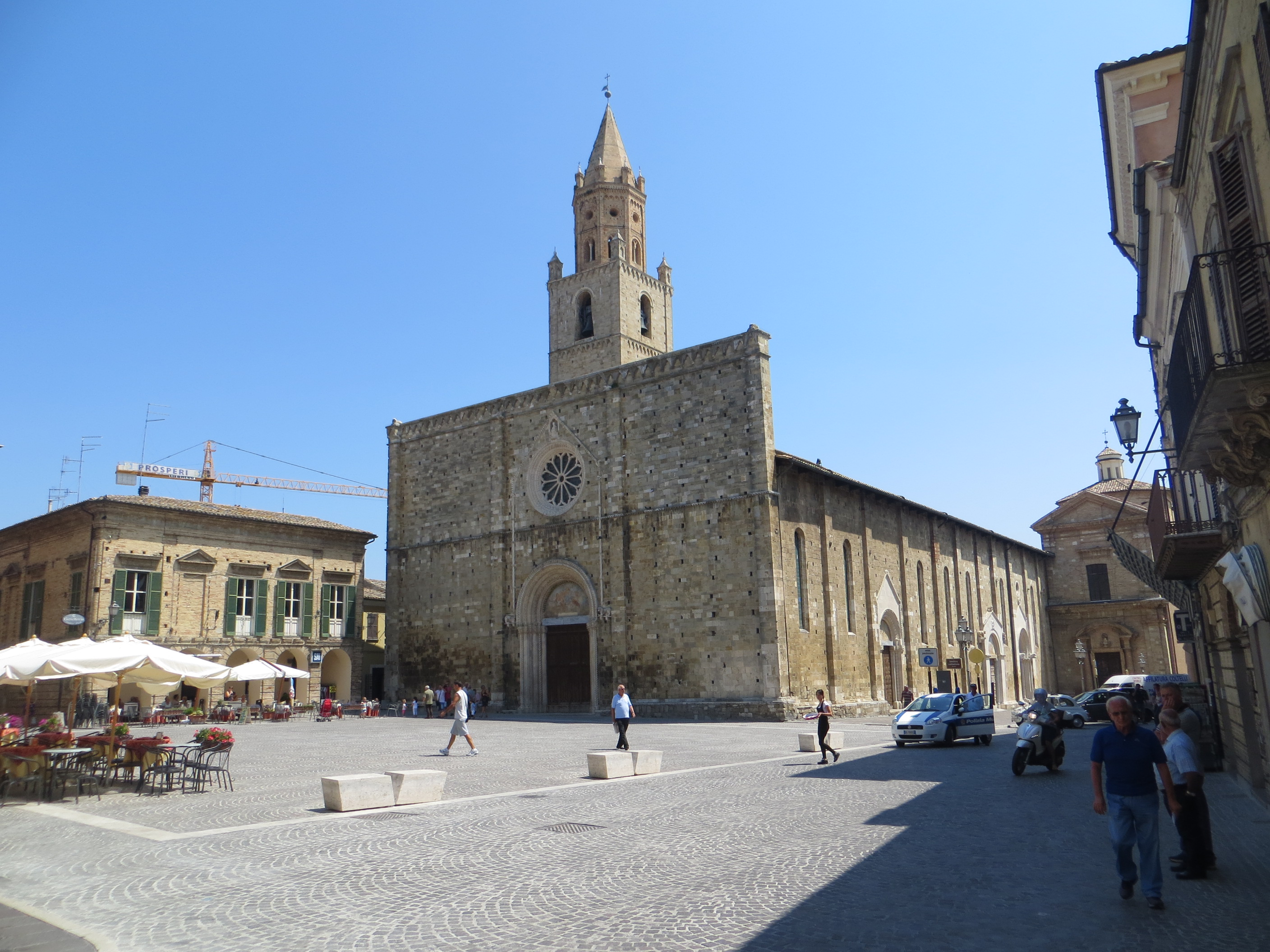
Atri

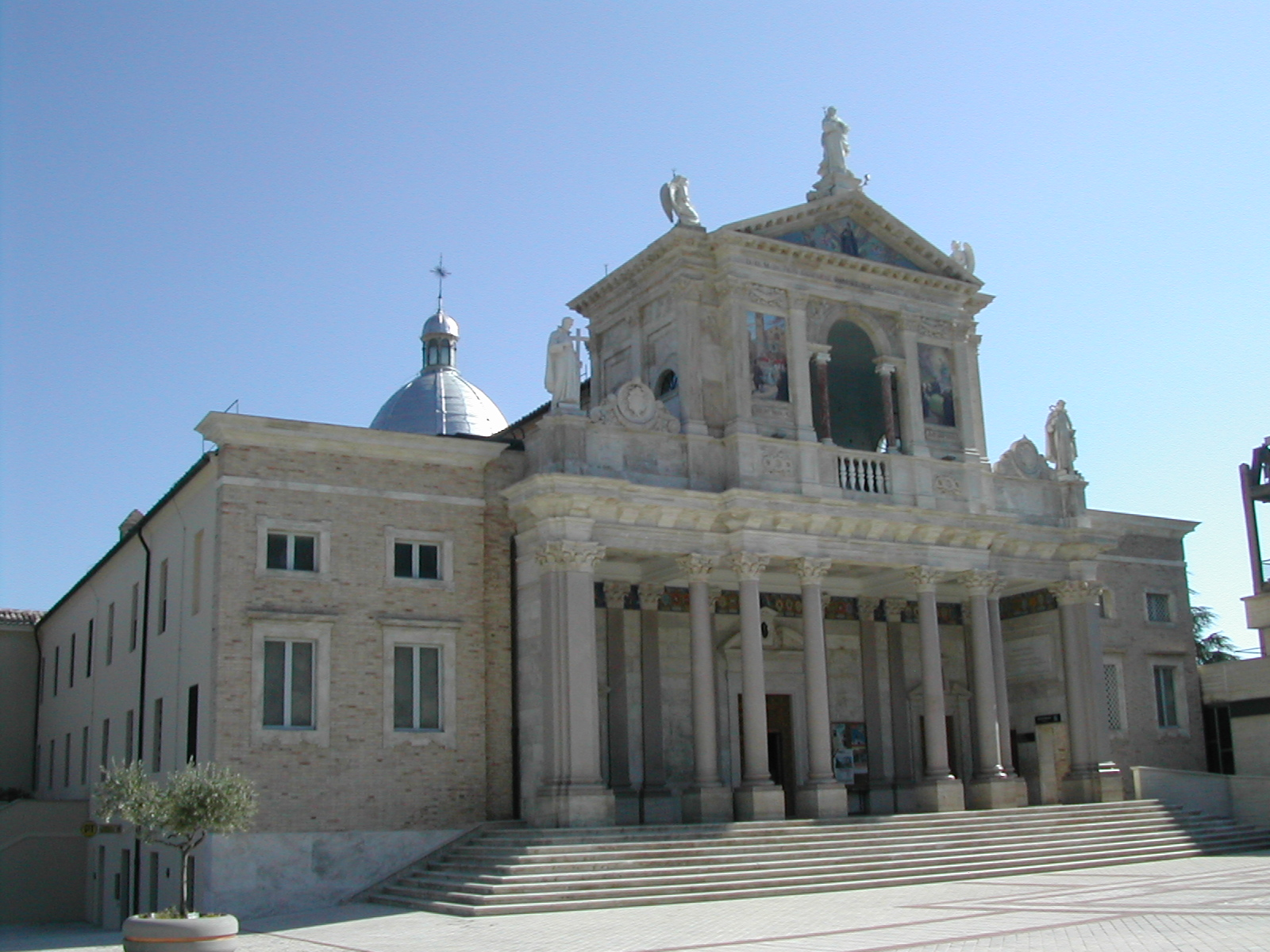
Shrine of Gabriel of Our Lady of Sorrows

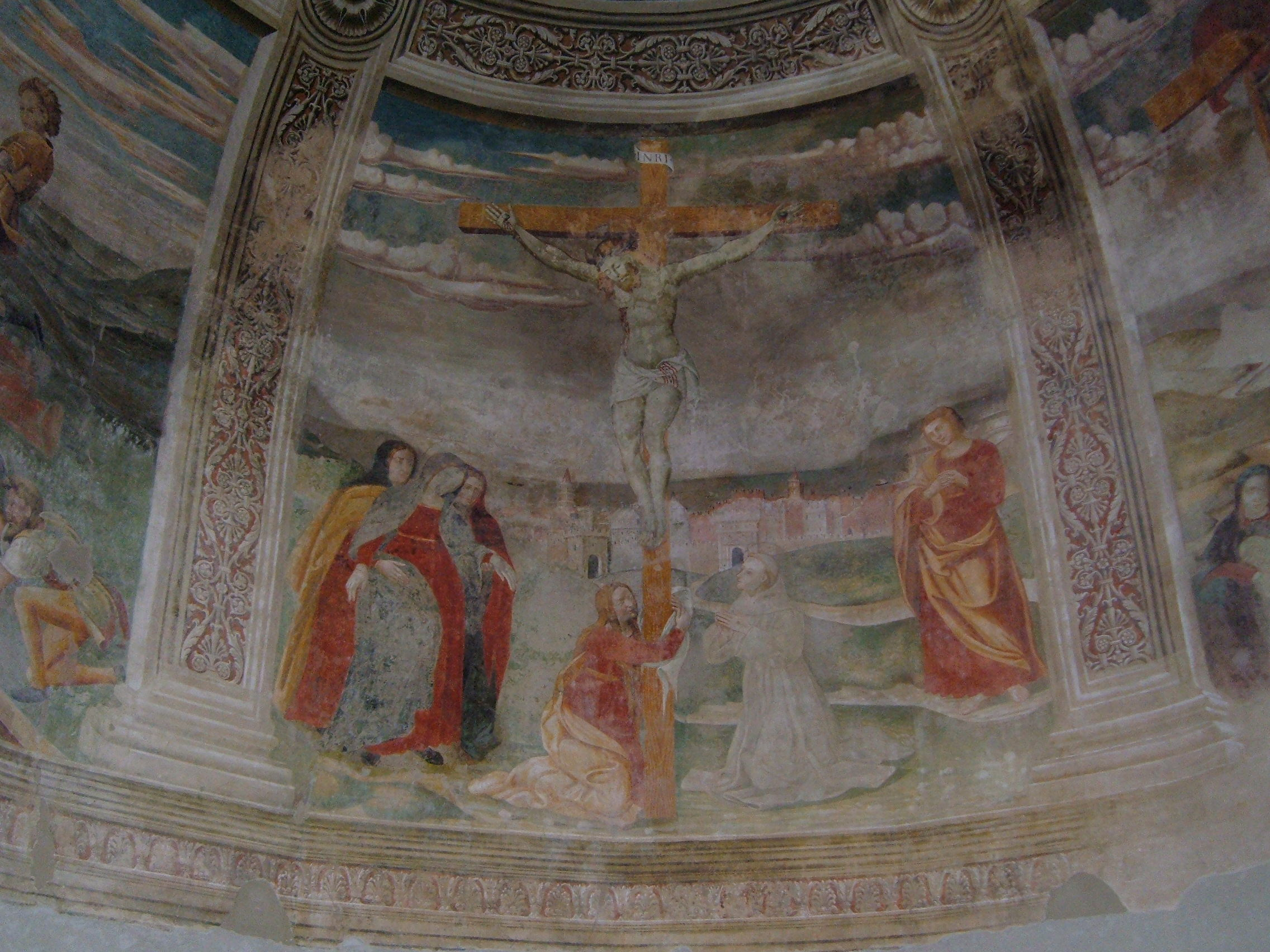
Tortoreto

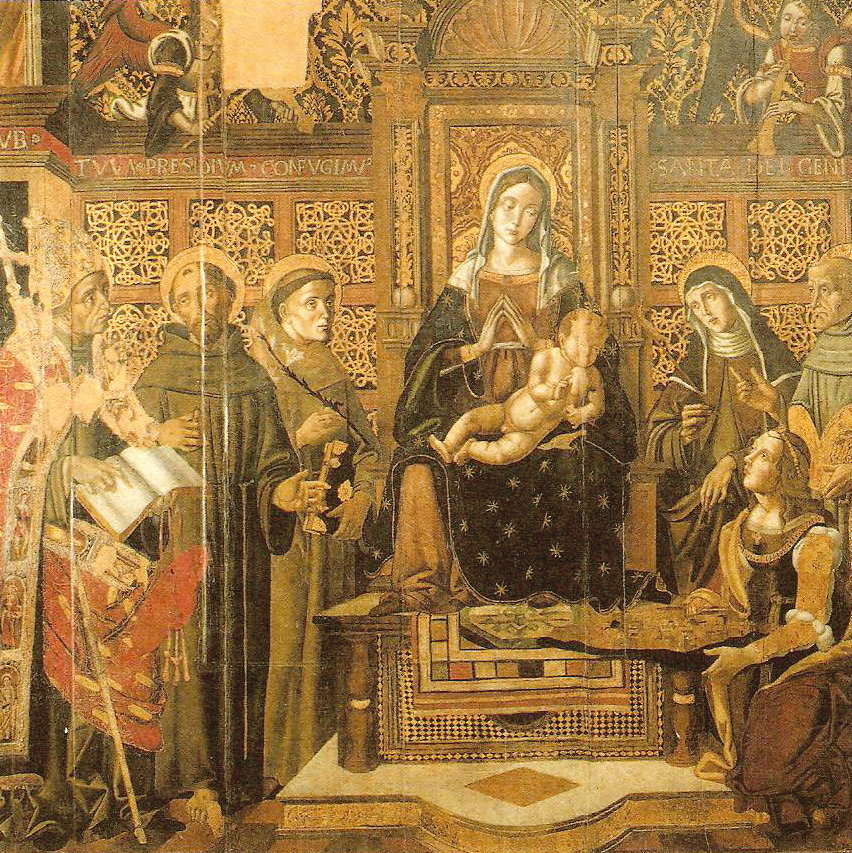
Atri
