= Pietranico =

- Comune
- Comune di Pietranico
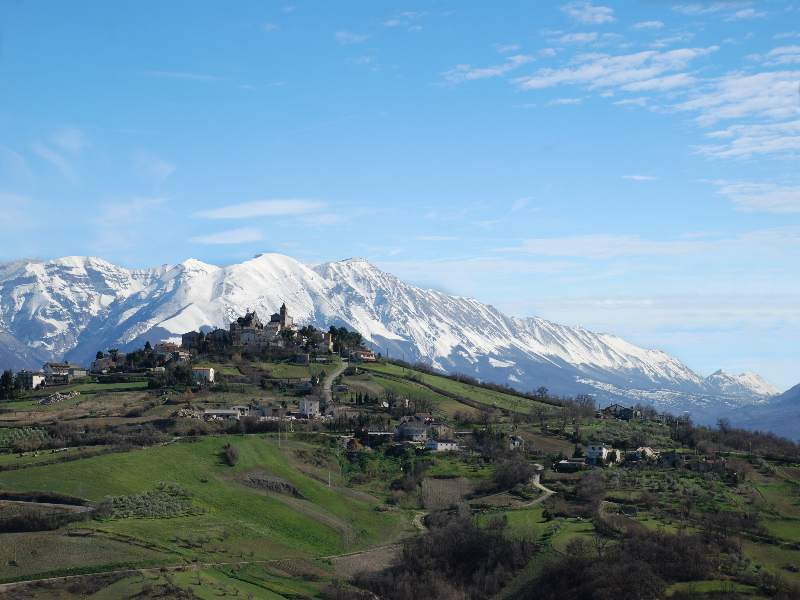
- Panoramic view of Pietranico

- Location within Italy Location within Abruzzo
- Coordinates: 42°17′N 13°55′E
- Country: Italy
- Region: Abruzzo
- Province: Pescara (PE)
- Frazioni: Valle Barone

Area
  - Total: 14 km^{2} (5.4 sq mi)
- Elevation: 590 m (1,940 ft)

Population (1 January 2007)
  - Total: 582
  - Density: 42/km^{2} (110/sq mi)
- Time zone: UTC+1 (CET)
  - Summer (DST): UTC+2 (CEST)
- Postal code: 65020
- Dialing code: 085
- Website: Official website

Pietranico is a village and comune of the province of Pescara in the Abruzzo region of central Italy.

== Geography ==
Alanno, Brittoli, Castiglione a Casauria, Civitaquana, Corvara, Cugnoli, Pescosansonesco and Torre de' Passeri are neighbouring towns.

== History ==
The town of Pietranico takes its title from a notable rock around which the castle, known as Pietraniqua, was built. Later on, the castle is referred to as Petrainiqua or Petram Iniquam. Apart from the ancient castle, most of the town was built from the 15th century onwards.

== Recent Developments ==
Due to its high position it has become a magnet for wind turbine installation with 4 being constructed in the last 3 years (up to Jan 2015) and more in consideration. The local council has very little power to stop this as it is being driven from a regional level.
