= Pescara Town Hall =

Historic building in Pescara, Italy

Coordinates: 42.4641°N 14.2141°E

- Palazzo di Città
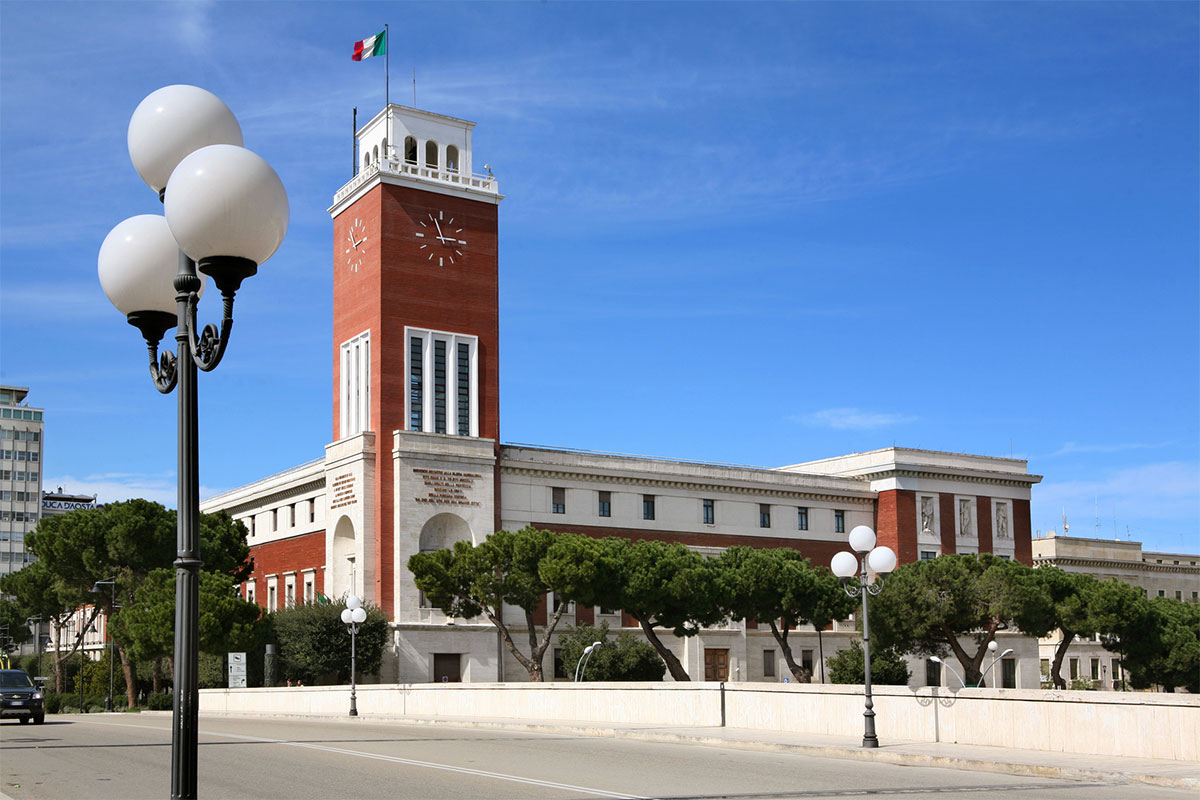
- Facade facing the Ponte Risorgimento.
- Interactive map of the Pescara Town Hall area

General information
- Architectural style: Rationalist
- Location: Pescara, Italy
- Year built: 1935
- Owner: Municipality of Pescara

Design and construction
- Architect: Vincenzo Pilotti

The Pescara Town Hall (Palazzo di Città) is a historic building in Pescara, serving as the seat of the city council and the mayor's offices.

Constructed in 1935 based on a design by Vincenzo Pilotti, the building is one of the most emblematic examples of Rationalist architecture from the Fascist regime in the city. Together with Piazza Italia, it forms what was conceived as the administrative center of Pescara, created in the 1930s following the merger with the municipality of Castellammare Adriatico and the elevation of the city to provincial capital. Along with the Clock Tower, the Palazzo di Città is considered one of the symbols of Pescara's citizenship.

== History ==
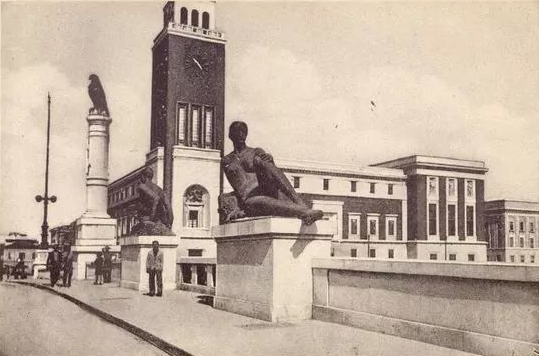
View from Ponte Littorio, destroyed by retreating Germans in 1944 during World War II

At the beginning of the 20th century, the rapid development of the urban centers of Pescara and Castellammare Adriatico led to their unification, decreeing the creation of the Province of Pescara in 1927. Already in the early 1920s, local administrative authorities began to reconsider the urban layout of the territory, expressing a clear intention to give a monumental appearance to the heart of the new city.

The selected area was the Vallicella – a zone located on the border between the two boroughs, close to the northern bank of the Aterno-Pescara river – which represented a compromise between the demands of Castellammare Adriatico, which claimed a specific role in the formation of the city after conceding on the name, and those of Pescara, which was not willing to yield dominance, leveraging support from Gabriele D'Annunzio. The podestà Berardo Montani entrusted the project to architect Vincenzo Pilotti, who envisioned a large octagonal square to concentrate the main public buildings of the new capital, including the Pescara town hall.

Designed by Pilotti in August 1933, the Palazzo di Città was completed and inaugurated two years later along with Piazza dei Vestini, now known as Piazza Italia. A series of changes made in 1935 to Pescara's urban plan reduced the original scenic appearance of the square. However, the complex comprising Palazzo di Città, the Clock Tower, and the Government Palace was built very quickly by 1936, adhering to the characteristics of Fascist regime Rationalist architecture, reflecting Pilotti's alignment with the academic classicism favored by Fascist hierarchs. Originally, the construction of Palazzo di Città included, on the side facing the river, a landing stage specifically designed by D'Annunzio for his seaplane trips. Until the advent of World War II, the loggia of the civic tower was topped with the iron inscription "duce".

== Description ==
=== Exterior ===
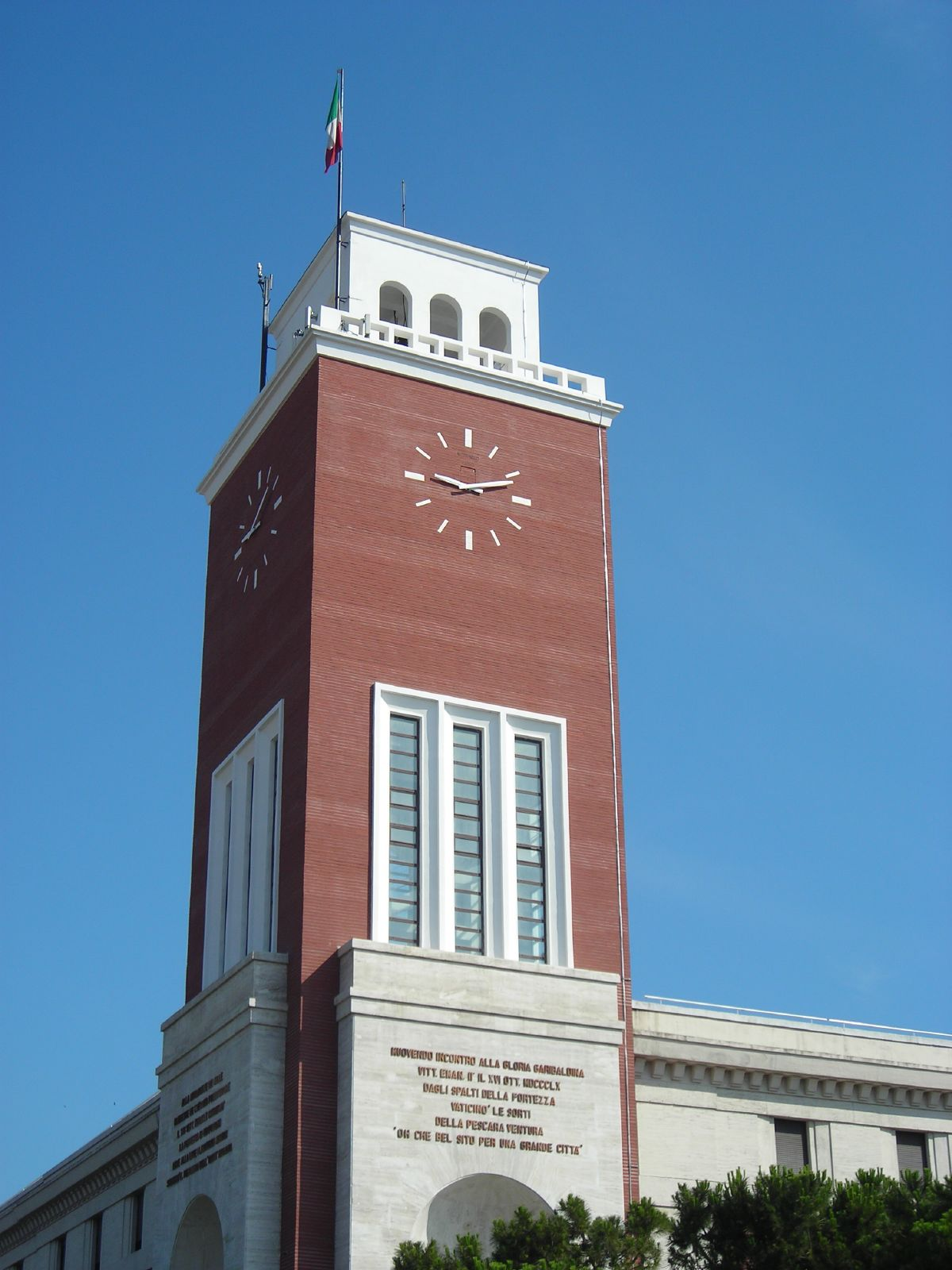
Detail of the Clock Tower

Palazzo di Città is one of the architectures that define Piazza Italia. Built according to the characteristics of early 20th-century Italian rationalism, the building is imbued with the monumental emphasis of the Fascist period and interprets a solemn vision of civil power, based on the values of man and lineage. The palace develops over three levels, following an L-shaped plan that places the bell tower at the intersection of the two bodies. The building is entirely constructed in travertine and bricks – which create a color contrast – and is distinguished by its formal and material relationships. The main entrance, located within the L, is preceded by a wide staircase and topped by a stone inscription bearing the name of the palace. The area in front is dedicated to Vincenzo Chiola, mayor of the city in the 1950s, as commemorated by a plaque on the entrance.

On the side of the same facade, there are a series of marble niches containing three female statues that allegorically represent poetic and artistic glory, as well as the sanctity of the place. The side facing the river is decorated with three male statues representing the abundance of river waters, a fisherman, and a miner. The side entrance is topped by a marble inscription "Ave dulce vatis flumen / Ave vetus urbis numen" ("Hail, sweet river of the Bard / Hail, ancient deity of the city"), taken from a 1927 couplet in homage to Gabriele D'Annunzio, dictated by Domenico Tinozzi as the first president of the newly established province of Pescara.

=== Interior ===
The interiors of the palace maintain the monumental style that characterizes Pilotti's work. A double-ramp staircase leads to the noble floor, where the municipality's representative halls, the Council Chamber, and the mayor's office are located. Marble atriums and grand staircases precede spacious and bright rooms suitable for hosting various forms of art. The Council Chamber is the most eloquent example, richly decorated with a series of paintings by Luigi Baldacci that trace – through a cycle of frescoes – the historical phases that marked the birth of Pescara. There are also two statues: one representing Gabriele D'Annunzio by Venanzo Crocetti, and the other depicting Grazia Masciarelli, known as "La Marinara", by Vicentino Michetti. The hall, originally conceived as a smaller space, was transformed into a monumental room measuring thirty meters by sixteen, as explicitly requested by Montani to Pilotti in the vein of the Salvatore Tommasi Provincial Library in L'Aquila.

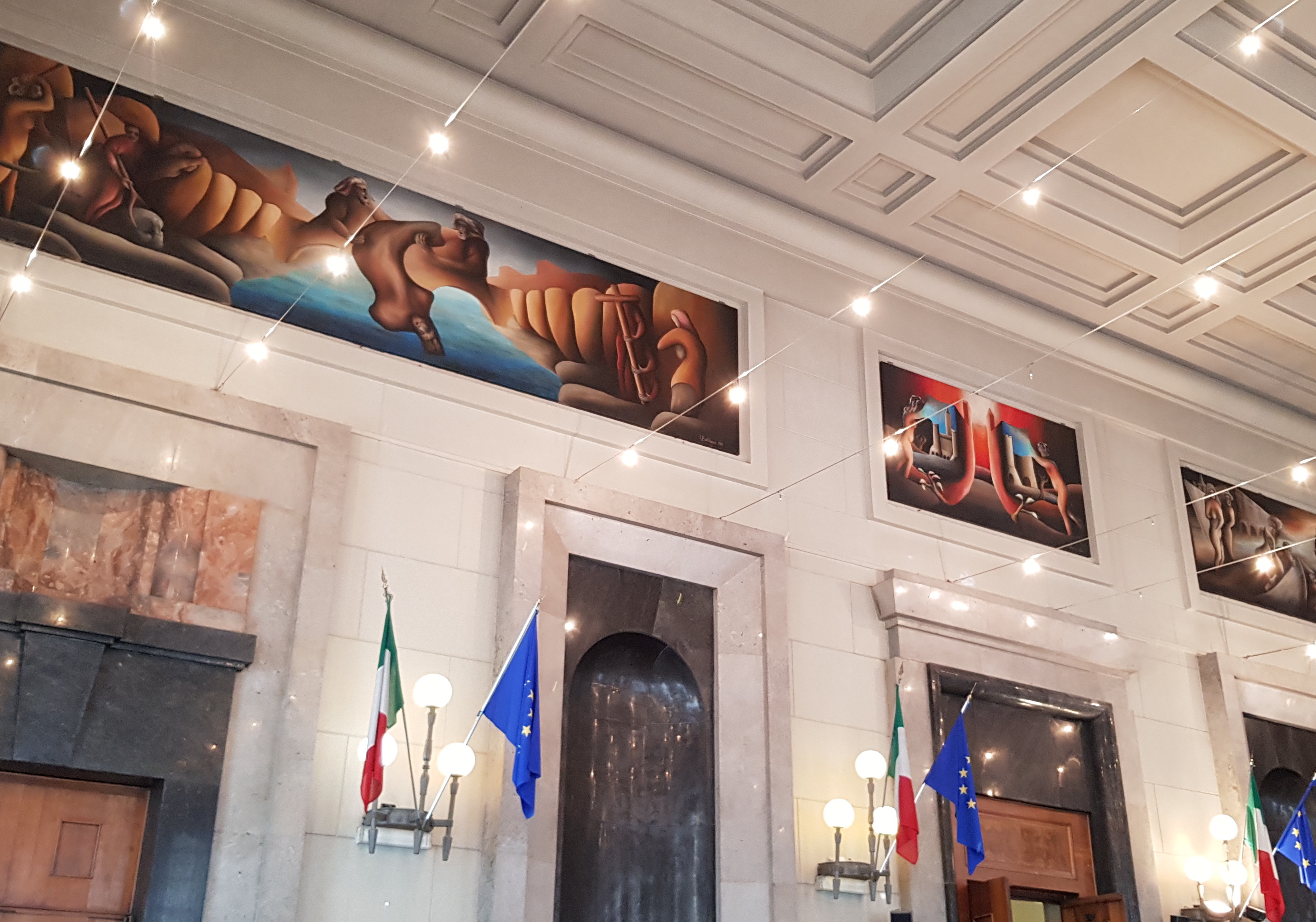
Detail of the council chamber, showing part of the frescoes by Luigi Baldacci

A miniature model of Fontana la Nave, initially exhibited in Piazza Santa Croce in Florence in 1986, is kept in one of the palace's atriums. The Sala Aternum – designed as a place of history and identity for the city – is a rich container of anthropological artifacts, set up thanks to contributions from the Museo delle Genti d'Abruzzo, the State Archives, and the Archaeological Superintendency. Works donated by the Cascella family can be admired, including Barche sul mare by Tommaso Cascella, Dopo il bagno by Michele Cascella, and Ai caduti del mare by Pietro Cascella. Historical city registers from the 17th and 18th centuries are on display, including Gabriele D'Annunzio's original birth certificate, the first urban plan by Leopoldo Muzii from 1882, and that of Luigi Piccinato from 1946.

=== Clock Tower ===
The bell tower, with a square base and located at the junction of the two palace bodies, is topped by a clock replicated in size and color on each of the four facades. The apex is characterized by an arched loggia enclosing the bell system. The clock's regulation mechanism is located on the first level of the structure, accessible from the roof of the two external bodies. On the sides of the tower are commemorative inscriptions honoring Victor Emmanuel II and Clemente de Caesaris. The latter was imprisoned in the Fortress of Pescara in 1849, as he was appointed by Giuseppe Garibaldi as provisional governor of the cities of L'Aquila, Chieti, and Teramo. Upon learning of the arrest, Garibaldi pressured and threatened the Bourbons to release De Caesaris. Once free, he managed to organize an uprising and conquered the fortress, handing it back to the Piedmontese in 1861. Following the proclamation of the Kingdom of Italy a few months later, King Victor Emmanuel II arrived in Castellammare Adriatico and Pescara, where, from the fortress ramparts, he uttered the phrase "Oh what a beautiful site for a great city," reported on one of the two inscriptions located on the sides of the civic tower.

== Bibliography ==
- Alici, Antonello; Appignani, Angela (2001). Le nuove provincie del fascismo. Architetture per le città capoluogo [The New Provinces of Fascism. Architectures for Capital Cities] (in Italian). Pescara: Archivio di Stato.
- Berrino, Annunziata; Buccaro, Alfredo (2018). Delli Aspetti de Paesi [Aspects of the provinces] (in Italian). Naples: Fedoa. ISBN 978-88-99930-00-4.
- Bianchetti, Cristina (1997). Pescara (in Italian). Rome: Laterza. ISBN 978-88-420-5377-4.
- Bortolotti, Nadine (1982). Gli anni trenta: arte e cultura in Italia [The Thirties: Art and Culture in Italy] (in Italian). Milan: Mazzotta. ISBN 88-202-0475-4.
- Di Biase, Licio (2010). La grande storia. Pescara-Castellammare dalle origini al XX secolo [The Great History. Pescara-Castellammare from its Origins to the 20th Century] (in Italian). Pescara: Tracce. ISBN 978-88-7433-633-3.
- Quieti, Giuseppe (2010). Pescara antica città [Pescara, Ancient City] (in Italian). Pescara: Carsa. ISBN 978-88-501-0250-1.
- Rando, Cinzia; Martinello, Guglielmo (1998). Pescara e provincia [Pescara and Province] (in Italian). Milan: Touring. ISBN 88-365-1192-9.
- Turco, Maria Grazia; Docci, Marina (2007). L'Architettura dell'"altra" modernità [The Architecture of the "Other" Modernity] (in Italian). Rome: Gangemi. ISBN 978-88-492-9203-9.
