= San Valentino in Abruzzo Citeriore =

- Comune
- Comune di San Valentino in Abruzzo Citeriore
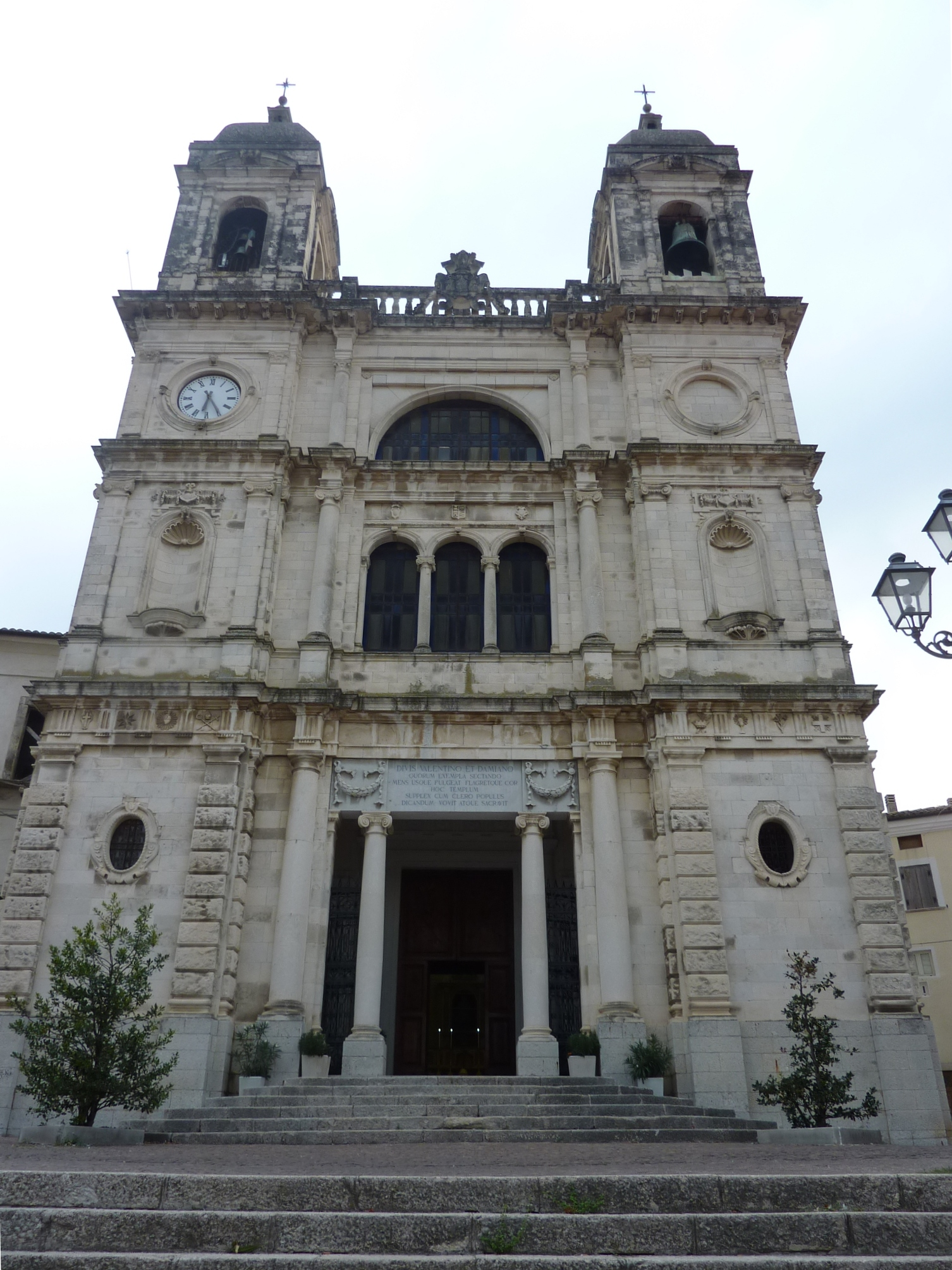
- View towards the Cathedral of San Valentino in Abruzzo Citeriore

- Coat of arms

- Location within Italy Location within Abruzzo
- Coordinates: 42°14′01″N 13°59′12″E
- Country: Italy
- Region: Abruzzo
- Province: Pescara (PE)
- Frazioni: Olivuccia, San Giovanni, Solcano, Trovigliano

Government
  - Mayor: Antonino D'Angelo

Area
  - Total: 16.4 km^{2} (6.3 sq mi)
- Elevation: 450 m (1,480 ft)

Population (28 February 2017)
  - Total: 1,918
  - Density: 117/km^{2} (303/sq mi)
- Demonym: Sanvalentinesi
- Time zone: UTC+1 (CET)
  - Summer (DST): UTC+2 (CEST)
- Postal code: 65020
- Dialing code: 085
- Patron saint: St. Nicholas of Tolentino
- Website: Official website

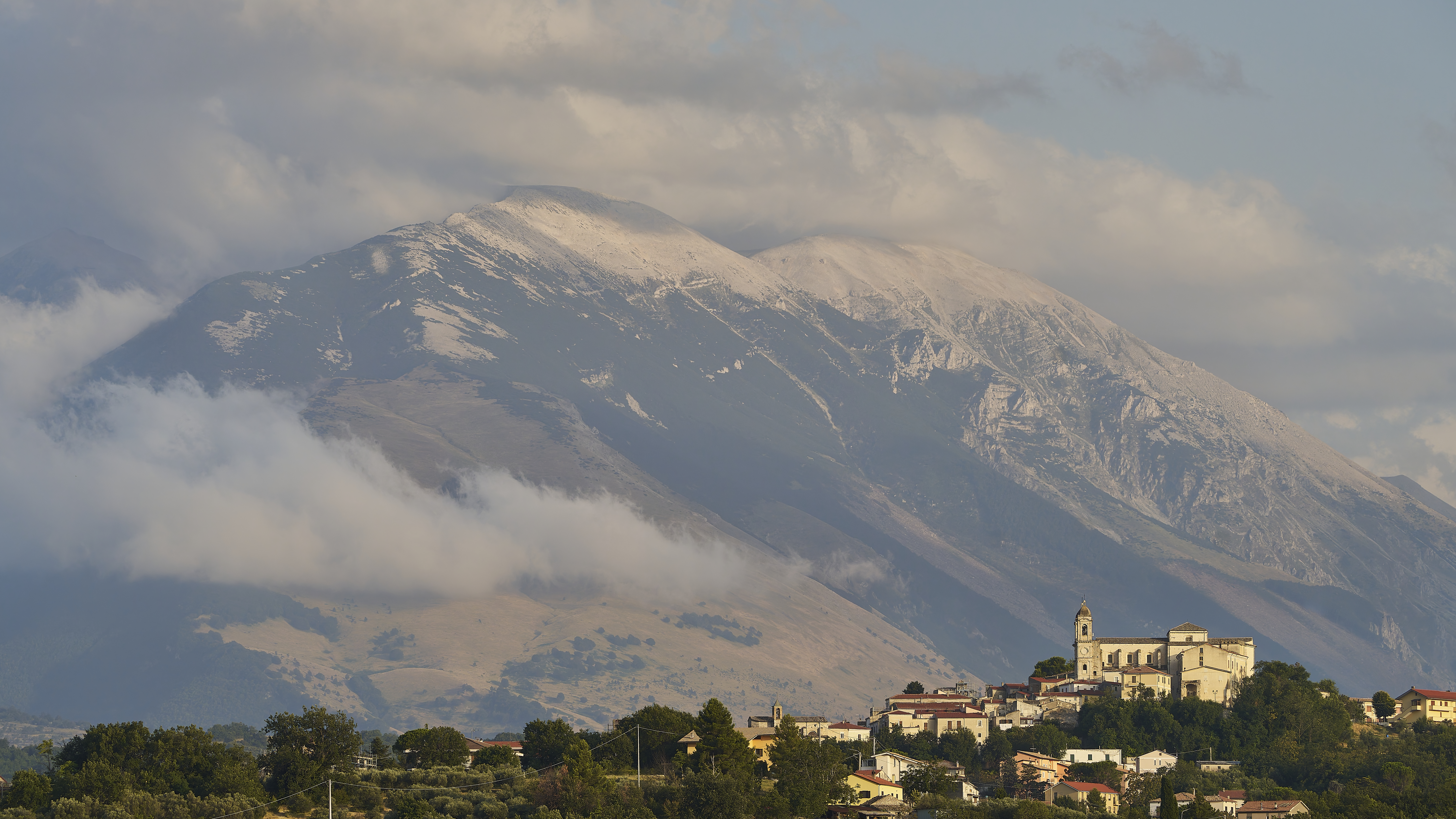
San Valentino with the Maiella near sunset

San Valentino in Abruzzo Citeriore is a mountain town in the province of Pescara, part of the Abruzzo region in central Italy.

Nestled in the Apennines, less than 40 kilometres (25 mi) from the Adriatic coast, the medieval town lies on the northern edge of Maiella National Park.

The town's name comes from St. Valentine and that of the old province in which the town was located, Abruzzo Citeriore.

One of San Valentino's most important architectural landmarks is Castello Farnese.

== Culture ==
In mid-November, the town hosts the Festival of the Cuckolds (Festa dei Cornuti), a parade honoring or deriding (depending on one's perspective) men with adulterous wives.
