= Elice =

- Comune
- Comune di Elice
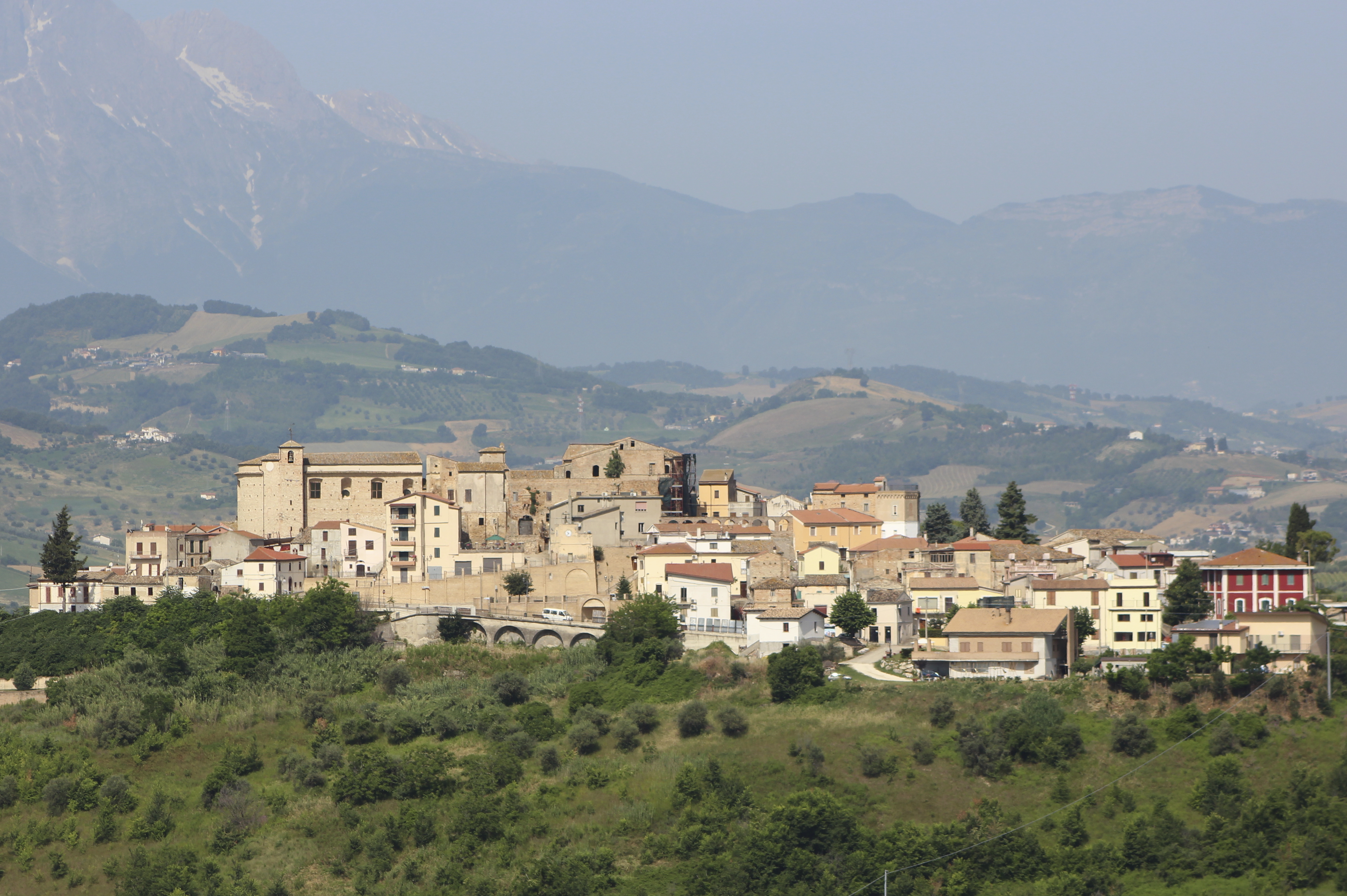
- View of Elice

- Coat of arms

- Location within Italy Location within Abruzzo
- Coordinates: 42°31′N 13°58′E
- Country: Italy
- Region: Abruzzo
- Province: Pescara (PE)
- Frazioni: Castellano, Colle d'Odio, Collina, Madonna degli Angeli, Quattro Strade, Sant'Agnello

Government
  - Mayor: Gianfranco De Massis

Area
  - Total: 14 km^{2} (5.4 sq mi)
- Elevation: 259 m (850 ft)

Population (2007)
  - Total: 1,748
  - Density: 120/km^{2} (320/sq mi)
- Time zone: UTC+1 (CET)
  - Summer (DST): UTC+2 (CEST)
- Postal code: 65010
- Dialing code: 085
- Website: Official website

Elice is a comune and town in the province of Pescara, part of the Abruzzo region of Italy.

== History ==
The territory, due to the fertility of the land, was inhabited since as early as the Paleolithic Age. The name of the village derives from holm oaks, which once covered the area. During the 15th century it belonged to the town of Penne and for a long time to the Castiglione family. It was known in the late 19th century for its ceramic workshops.

Images of Elice

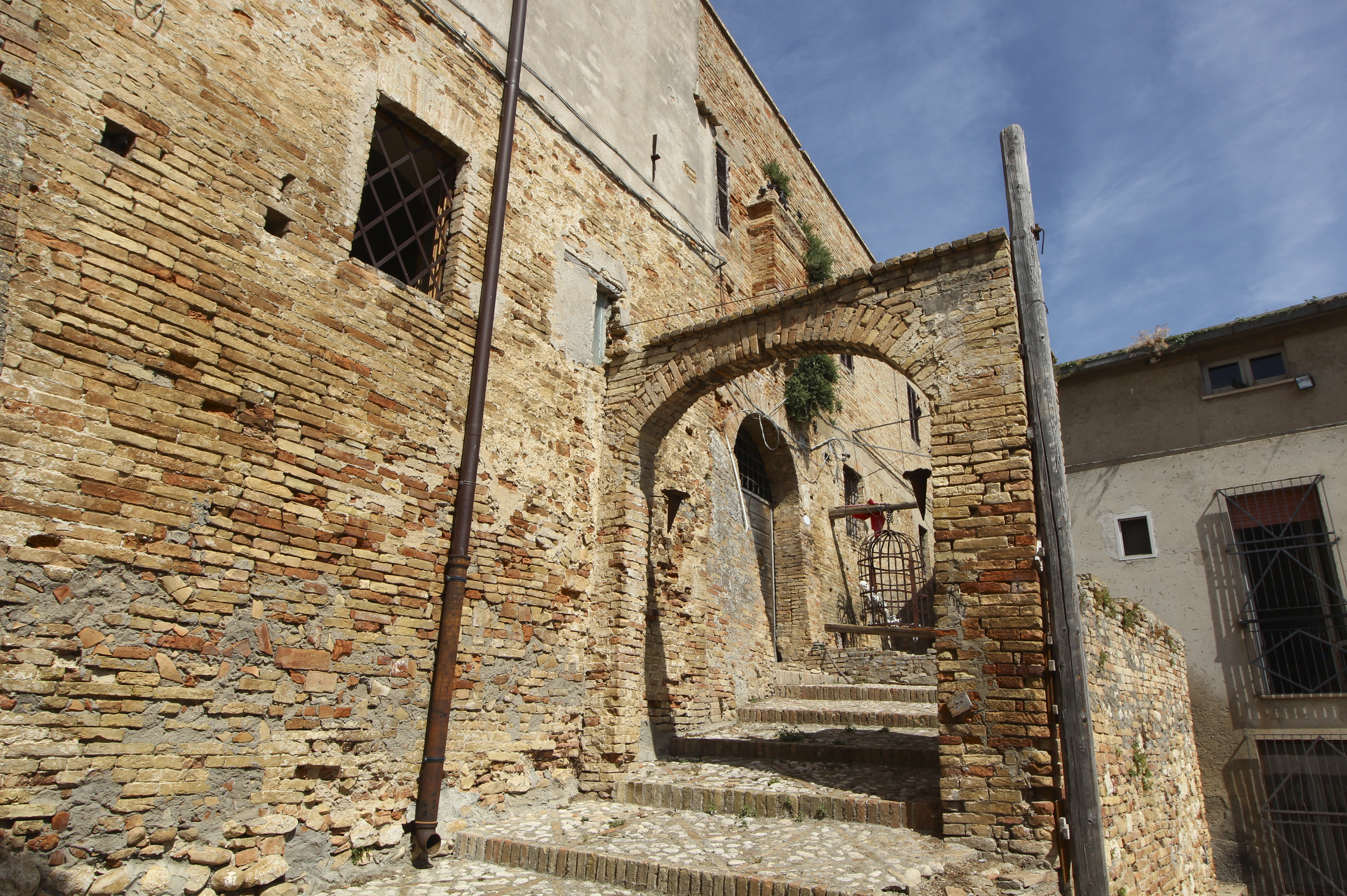
Entrance to the castle

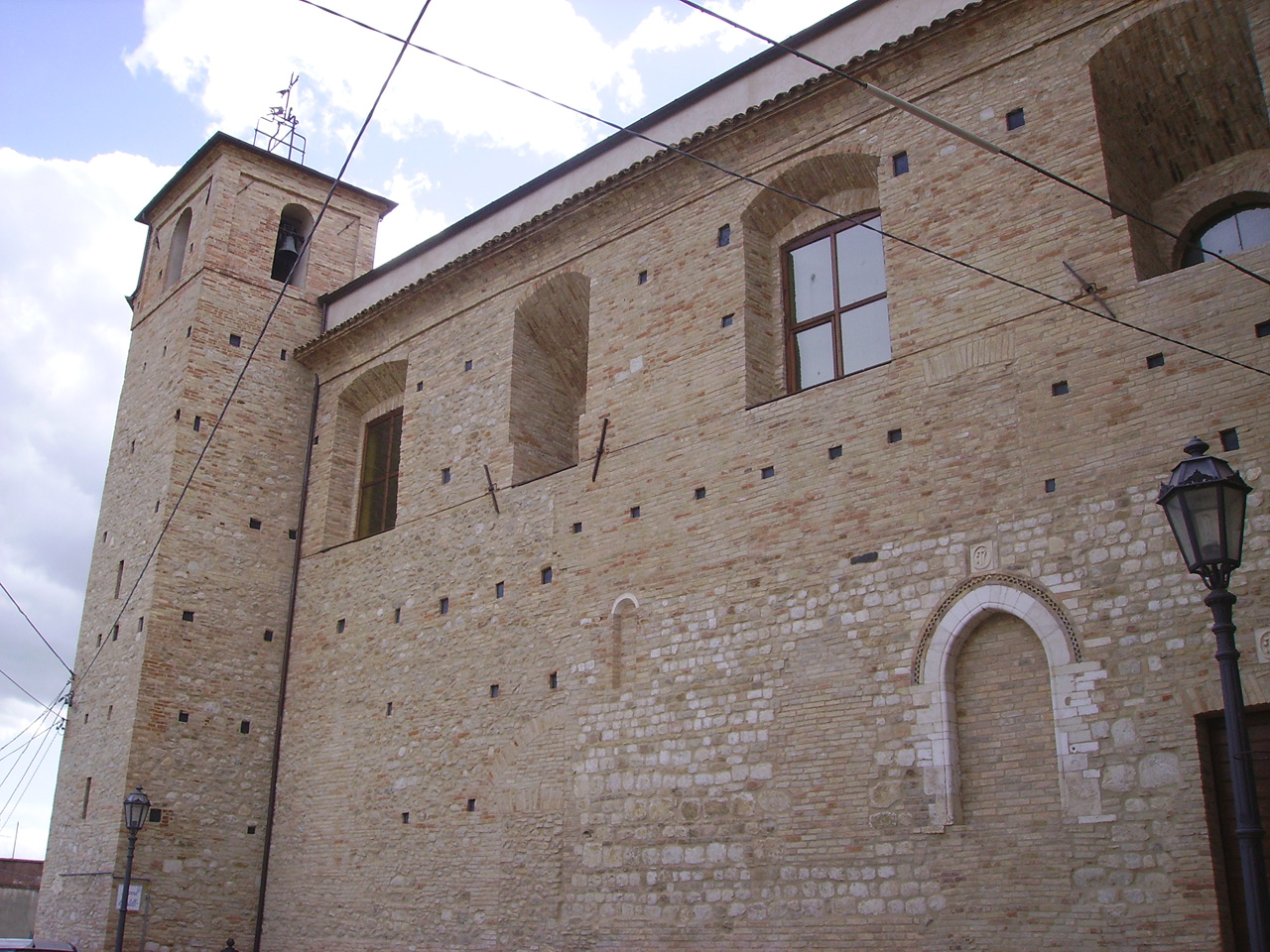
The church San Martino

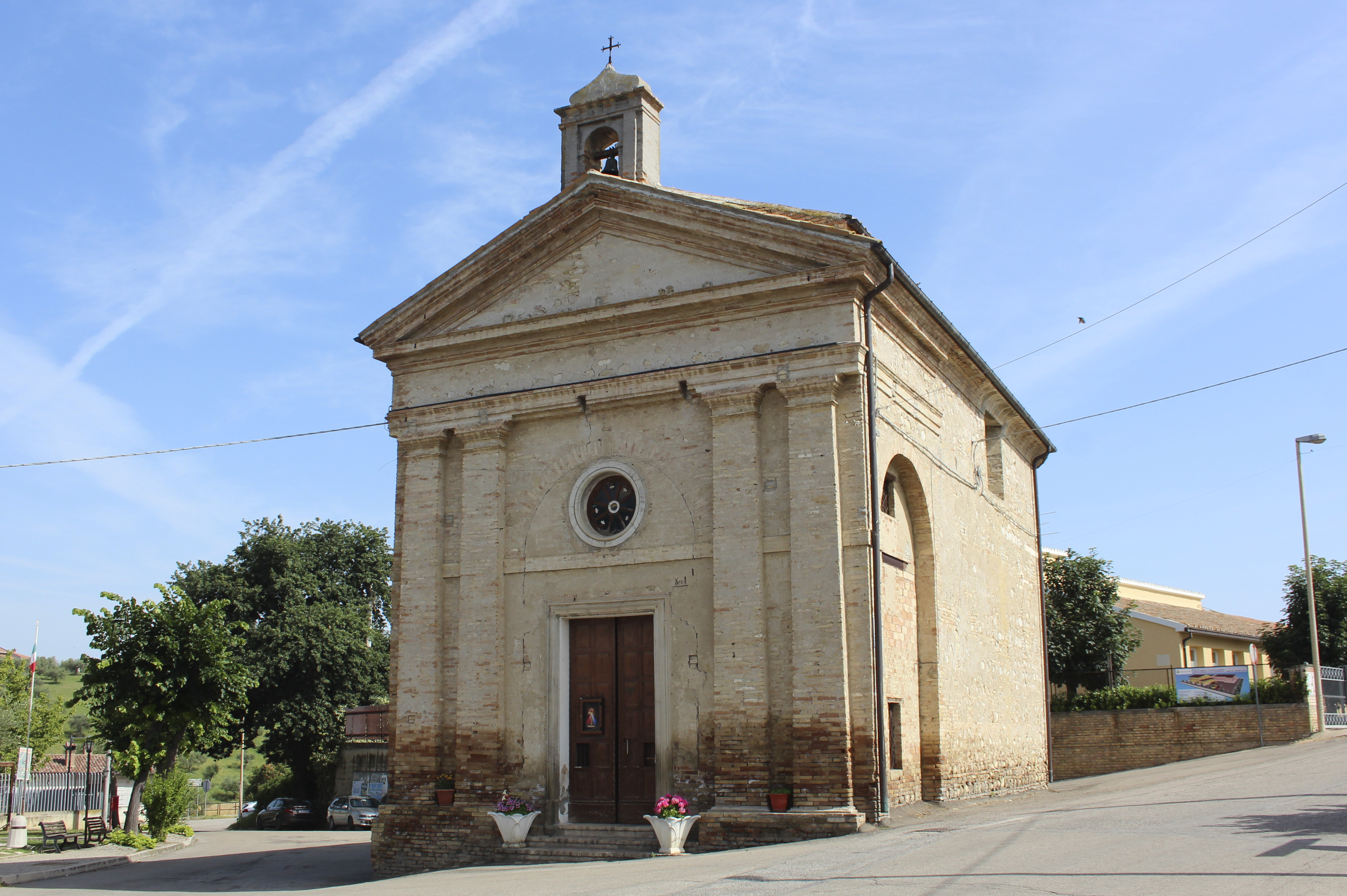
The church San Rocco
