= Collecorvino =

- Comune
- Comune di Collecorvino
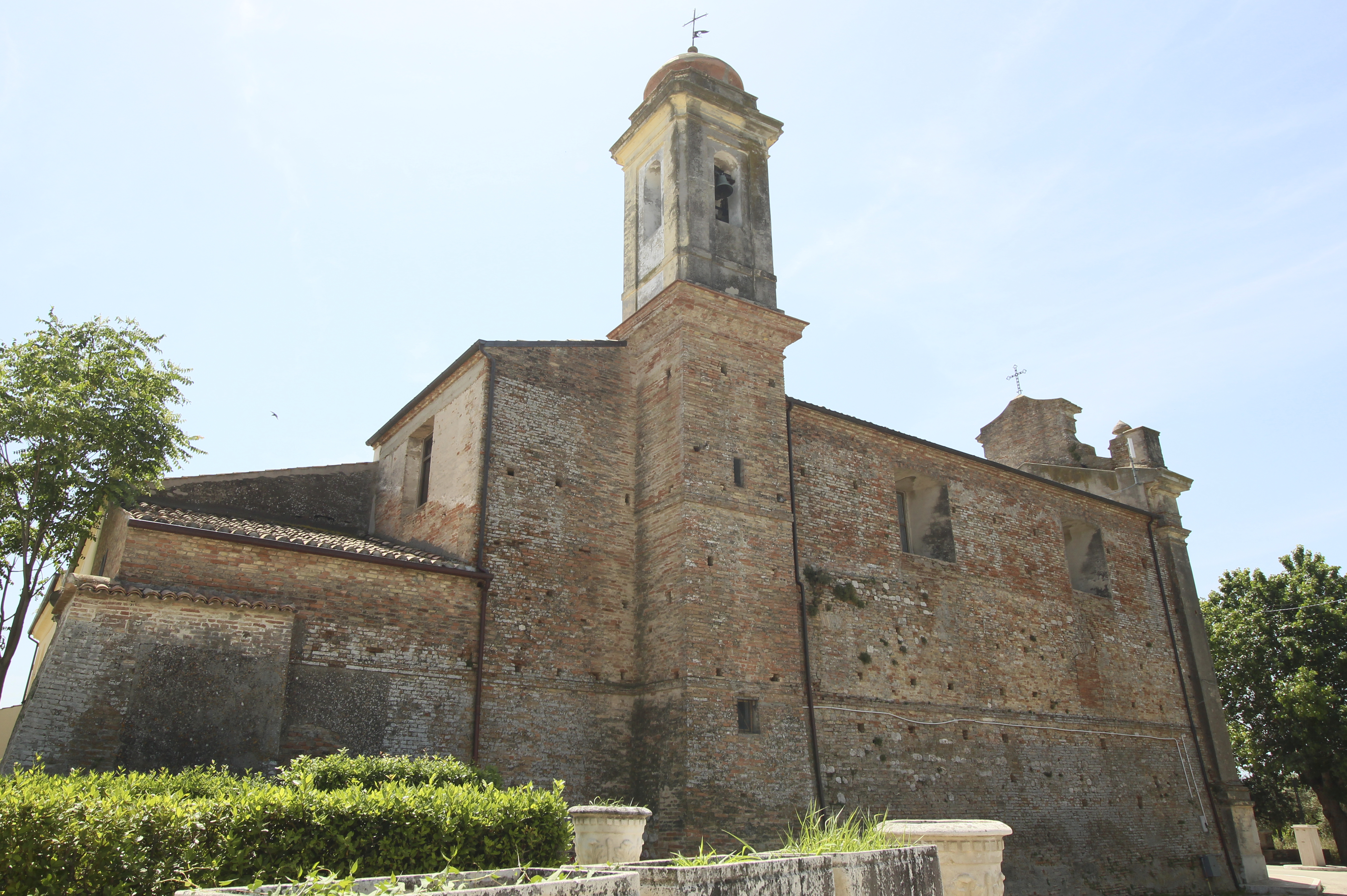
- View of Collecorvino

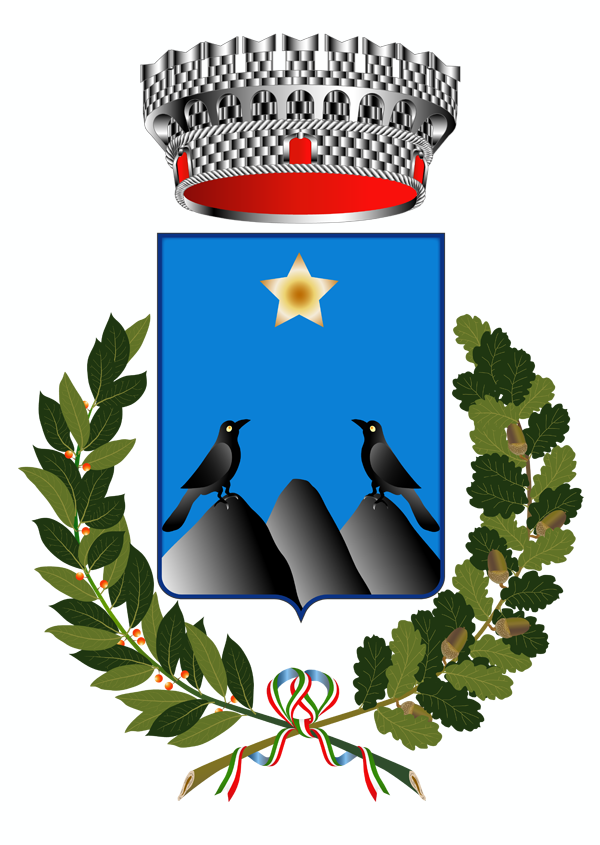
- Coat of arms

- Location within Italy Location within Abruzzo
- Coordinates: 42°27′N 14°01′E
- Country: Italy
- Region: Abruzzo
- Province: Pescara (PE)
- Frazioni: Barberi, Campotino, Caparrone, Cepraneto, Congiunti, Raieta, Santa Lucia, Santa Maria, Torre

Government
  - Mayor: Paolo D'Amico (since 2021) (W Collecorvino Sempre)

Area
  - Total: 32 km^{2} (12 sq mi)
- Elevation: 254 m (833 ft)

Population (2024)
  - Total: 5,976
  - Density: 190/km^{2} (480/sq mi)
- Time zone: UTC+1 (CET)
  - Summer (DST): UTC+2 (CEST)
- Postal code: 65010
- Dialing code: 085
- Patron saint: Santi Filippo e Giacomo

Collecorvino is a comune and town in the Province of Pescara in the Abruzzo region of Italy.
