= Catignano =

- Comune
- Comune di Catignano
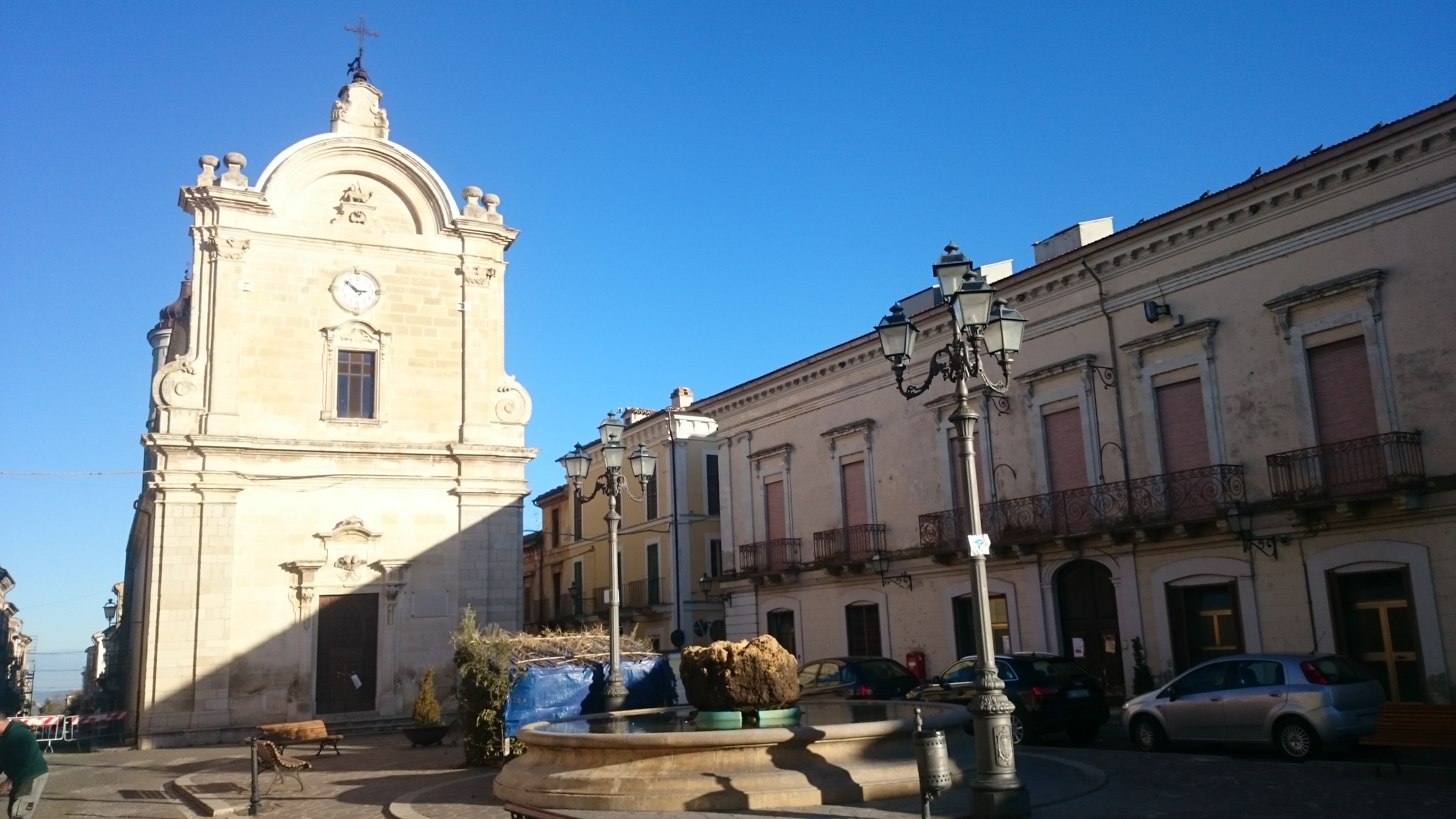
- View of Catignano

- Location within Italy Location within Abruzzo
- Coordinates: 42°21′N 13°57′E
- Country: Italy
- Region: Abruzzo
- Province: Pescara (PE)
- Frazioni: Contrada De Contra, Contrada Micarone, Contrada Varano

Government
  - Mayor: Francesco Lattenzio (since 2024) (Ind.)

Area
  - Total: 17 km^{2} (6.6 sq mi)
- Elevation: 365 m (1,198 ft)

Population (2024)
  - Total: 1,218
  - Density: 72/km^{2} (190/sq mi)
- Time zone: UTC+1 (CET)
  - Summer (DST): UTC+2 (CEST)
- Postal code: 65011
- Dialing code: 085
- Patron saint: Santa Croce (Saint)

Catignano (locally Catigènë) is a comune and town in the Province of Pescara in the Abruzzo region of Italy.

== Climate ==
Climate data for Catignano, elevation 323 m (1,060 ft), (1991-2020)
Month	Jan	Feb	Mar	Apr	May	Jun	Jul	Aug	Sep	Oct	Nov	Dec	Year
Record high °C (°F)	23.0 (73.4)	22.8 (73.0)	26.8 (80.2)	26.4 (79.5)	33.1 (91.6)	36.2 (97.2)	41.0 (105.8)	39.0 (102.2)	37.2 (99.0)	32.2 (90.0)	28.6 (83.5)	25.8 (78.4)	41.0 (105.8)
Mean daily maximum °C (°F)	10.5 (50.9)	11.3 (52.3)	14.3 (57.7)	17.7 (63.9)	21.8 (71.2)	26.3 (79.3)	28.9 (84.0)	29.1 (84.4)	24.3 (75.7)	19.8 (67.6)	15.3 (59.5)	11.6 (52.9)	19.2 (66.6)
Daily mean °C (°F)	7.2 (45.0)	7.6 (45.7)	10.4 (50.7)	13.6 (56.5)	17.6 (63.7)	22.0 (71.6)	24.5 (76.1)	24.7 (76.5)	20.2 (68.4)	16.1 (61.0)	11.9 (53.4)	8.4 (47.1)	15.4 (59.7)
Mean daily minimum °C (°F)	3.8 (38.8)	4.0 (39.2)	6.5 (43.7)	9.6 (49.3)	13.4 (56.1)	17.6 (63.7)	20.1 (68.2)	20.3 (68.5)	16.1 (61.0)	12.4 (54.3)	8.6 (47.5)	5.2 (41.4)	11.5 (52.7)
Record low °C (°F)	−9.5 (14.9)	−5.1 (22.8)	−6.8 (19.8)	−2.0 (28.4)	4.0 (39.2)	8.2 (46.8)	12.0 (53.6)	8.0 (46.4)	6.0 (42.8)	2.4 (36.3)	−3.0 (26.6)	−6.0 (21.2)	−9.5 (14.9)
Average precipitation mm (inches)	62.6 (2.46)	53.6 (2.11)	57.7 (2.27)	68.8 (2.71)	65.3 (2.57)	52.5 (2.07)	51.8 (2.04)	39.0 (1.54)	71.4 (2.81)	70.8 (2.79)	86.0 (3.39)	74.3 (2.93)	753.7 (29.67)
Average precipitation days (≥ 1.0 mm)	7.7	7.7	7.7	8.2	8.6	5.5	4.6	4.4	6.5	7.6	9.1	9.2	86.8
Source 1: Istituto Superiore per la Protezione e la Ricerca Ambientale
Source 2: Regione Abruzzo
