= Alanno =

- Comune
- Comune di Alanno
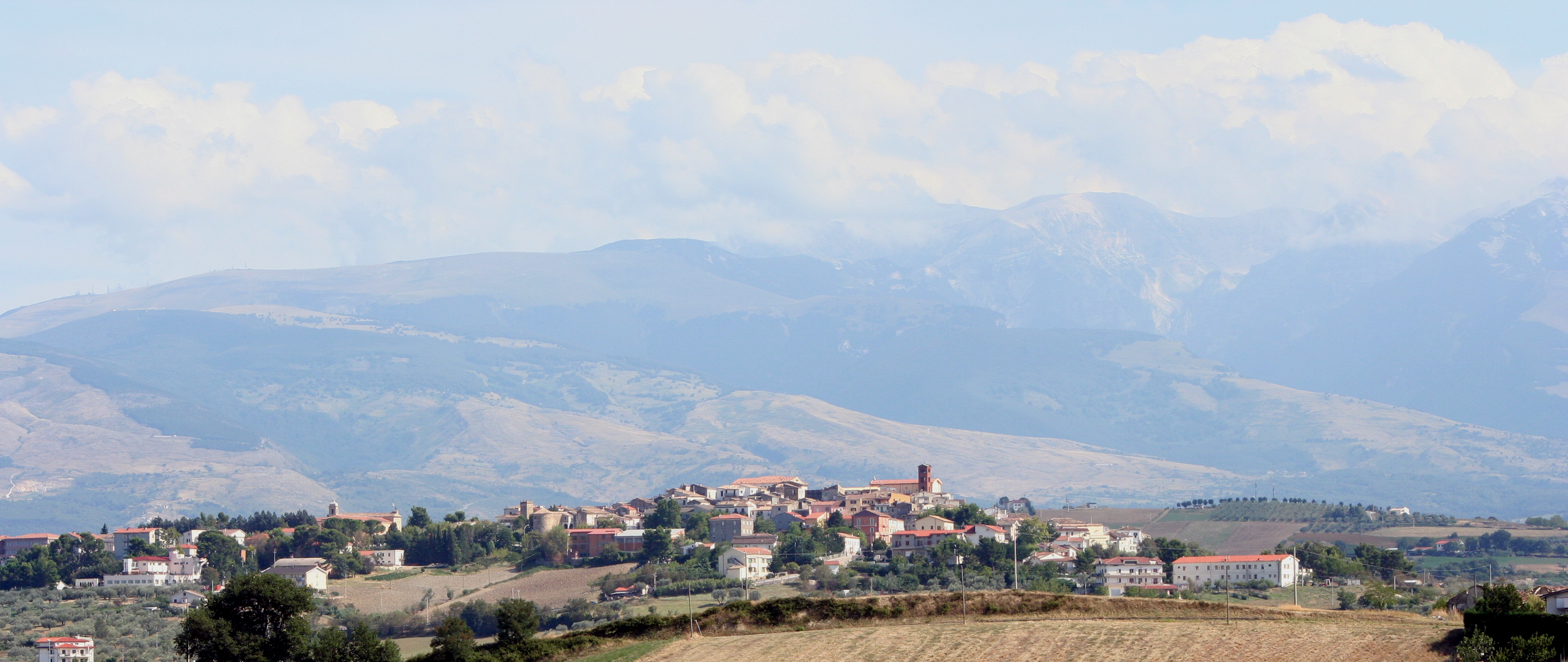
- View of Alanno

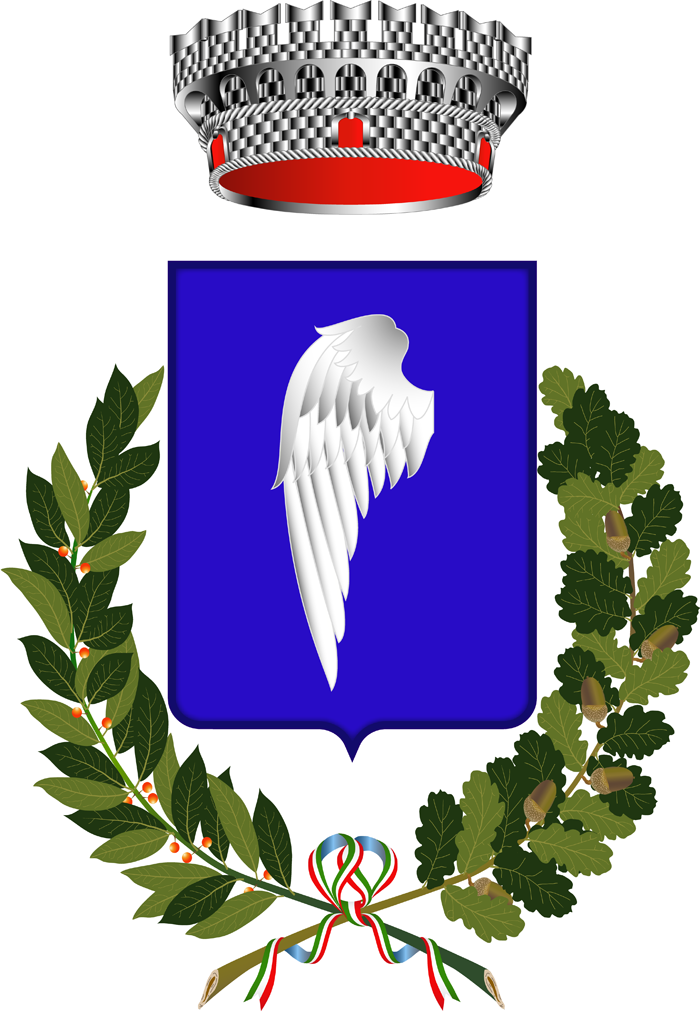
- Coat of arms

- Location within Italy Location within Abruzzo
- Coordinates: 42°18′N 13°58′E
- Country: Italy
- Region: Abruzzo
- Province: Pescara (PE)
- Frazioni: Alanno Stazione, Colle Grande, Costa delle Plaie, Oratorio, Prati, Sant'Agata Case, Sperduto, Ticchione

Government
  - Mayor: Oscar Pezzi (Ind.)

Area
  - Total: 32.53 km^{2} (12.56 sq mi)
- Elevation: 307 m (1,007 ft)

Population (31 March 2017)
  - Total: 3,493
  - Density: 107.4/km^{2} (278.1/sq mi)
- Demonym: Alannesi
- Time zone: UTC+1 (CET)
  - Summer (DST): UTC+2 (CEST)
- Postal code: 65010
- Dialing code: 085
- Saint day: 3 February
- Website: Official website

Alanno is a comune and town in the province of Pescara in the Abruzzo region of Italy.

The first settlement of Alanno dates probably from the medieval Lombard domination. Later it was a possession of the heirs of Ettore Fieramosca.

== History ==
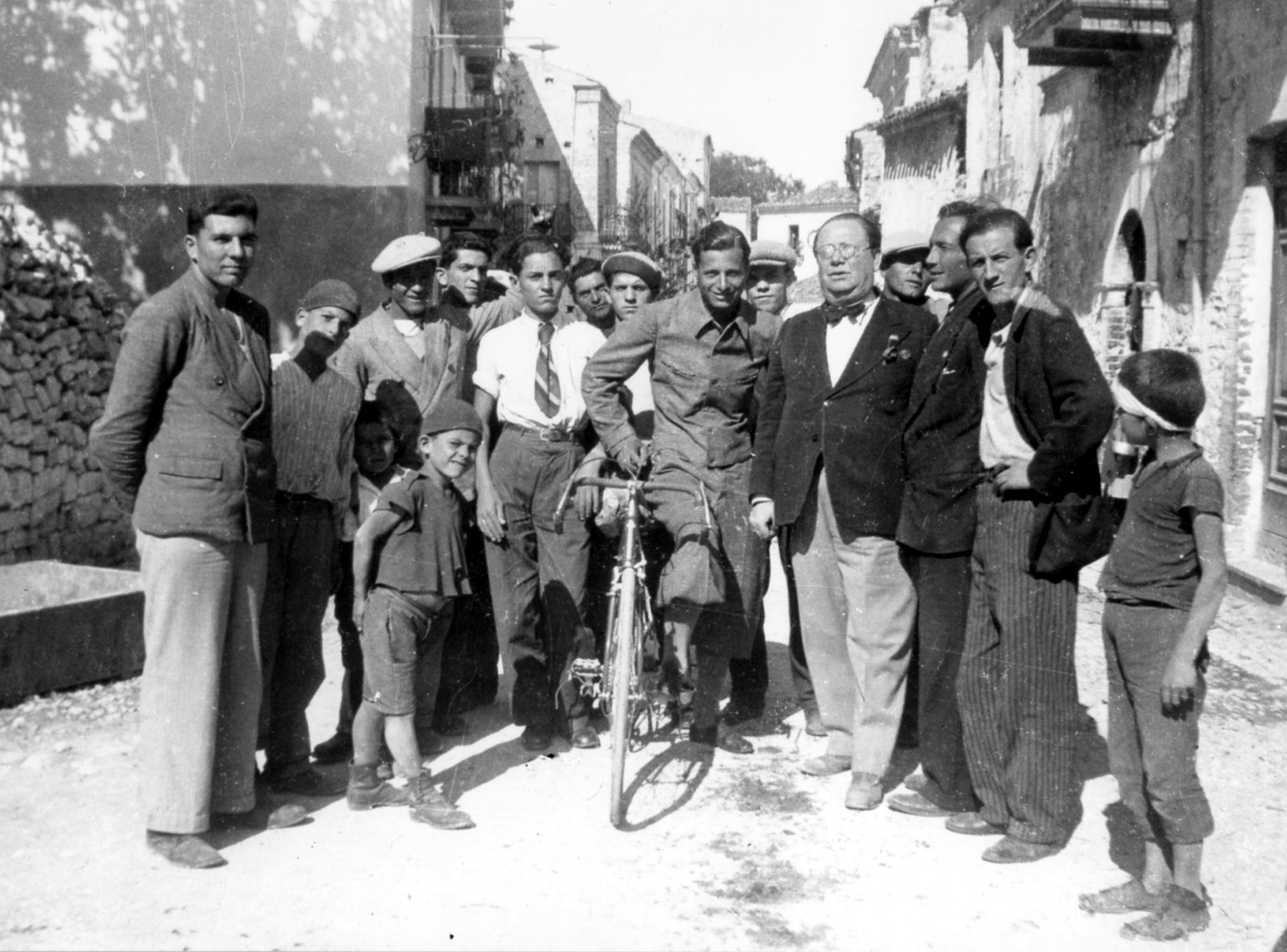
People in Alanno in the 1930s

Even if the territory of Alanno was inhabited since the Bronze Age, Alanno was likely founded as a fort (castrum) by the Longobards around the 4th or 5th centuries.

After having been a fief of the Abbey of San Clemente a Casauria for centuries, it was ruled by a succession of feudal families since the 14th century: Camponeschi, Caracciolo, D'Aquino, and Fieramosca (since 1739).

114 families were recorded as taxpayers in 1443, and 190 families were fiscally registered in 1532.

San Biagio parish church was rebuilt as a consequence of the 1915 Avezzano earthquake.

== Geography ==
Alanno lies at the southeastern foothills of the Gran Sasso d'Italia massif.

The old town of Alanno is located on a hill, which is surrounded by Aterno river and a stream named Cigno.

The old town is close to the small economic center (Alanno Scalo), which benefits economically from local manufacturing plants, Alanno railway station on the Rome–Sulmona–Pescara railway, and access to the A25 motorway.

A reservoir (Alanno-Piano d'Orta dam) on the Aterno river led to the birth of a natural reserve called Oasis of Alanno Lake, for the preservation of animal and plant species, including some species of waterbirds and the yellow iris.

=== Climate ===
Climate data for Alanno, elevation 295 m (968 ft), (1951–2000)
Month	Jan	Feb	Mar	Apr	May	Jun	Jul	Aug	Sep	Oct	Nov	Dec	Year
Record high °C (°F)	22.5 (72.5)	23.7 (74.7)	26.9 (80.4)	29.3 (84.7)	34.2 (93.6)	38.7 (101.7)	42.7 (108.9)	42.0 (107.6)	36.5 (97.7)	32.2 (90.0)	27.8 (82.0)	22.6 (72.7)	42.7 (108.9)
Mean daily maximum °C (°F)	9.6 (49.3)	10.9 (51.6)	13.6 (56.5)	17.2 (63.0)	22.4 (72.3)	26.8 (80.2)	29.7 (85.5)	29.6 (85.3)	25.4 (77.7)	19.6 (67.3)	14.4 (57.9)	10.7 (51.3)	19.2 (66.5)
Daily mean °C (°F)	6.6 (43.9)	7.5 (45.5)	9.9 (49.8)	13.2 (55.8)	17.9 (64.2)	22.0 (71.6)	24.7 (76.5)	24.7 (76.5)	20.9 (69.6)	16.0 (60.8)	11.3 (52.3)	7.9 (46.2)	15.2 (59.4)
Mean daily minimum °C (°F)	3.6 (38.5)	4.2 (39.6)	6.2 (43.2)	9.1 (48.4)	13.5 (56.3)	17.2 (63.0)	19.7 (67.5)	19.7 (67.5)	16.5 (61.7)	12.3 (54.1)	8.2 (46.8)	5.0 (41.0)	11.3 (52.3)
Record low °C (°F)	−9.0 (15.8)	−4.5 (23.9)	−6.8 (19.8)	−0.9 (30.4)	2.5 (36.5)	7.0 (44.6)	10.1 (50.2)	9.5 (49.1)	6.0 (42.8)	1.9 (35.4)	−2.6 (27.3)	−5.7 (21.7)	−9.0 (15.8)
Average precipitation mm (inches)	64.2 (2.53)	57.6 (2.27)	63.9 (2.52)	68.5 (2.70)	51.6 (2.03)	53.5 (2.11)	36.7 (1.44)	44.2 (1.74)	67.0 (2.64)	76.9 (3.03)	86.4 (3.40)	79.4 (3.13)	749.9 (29.54)
Average precipitation days	7.1	7.4	7.6	7.5	6.7	5.8	4.4	4.5	6.0	7.9	8.7	9.1	82.7
Source: Regione Abruzzo

== Attractions ==
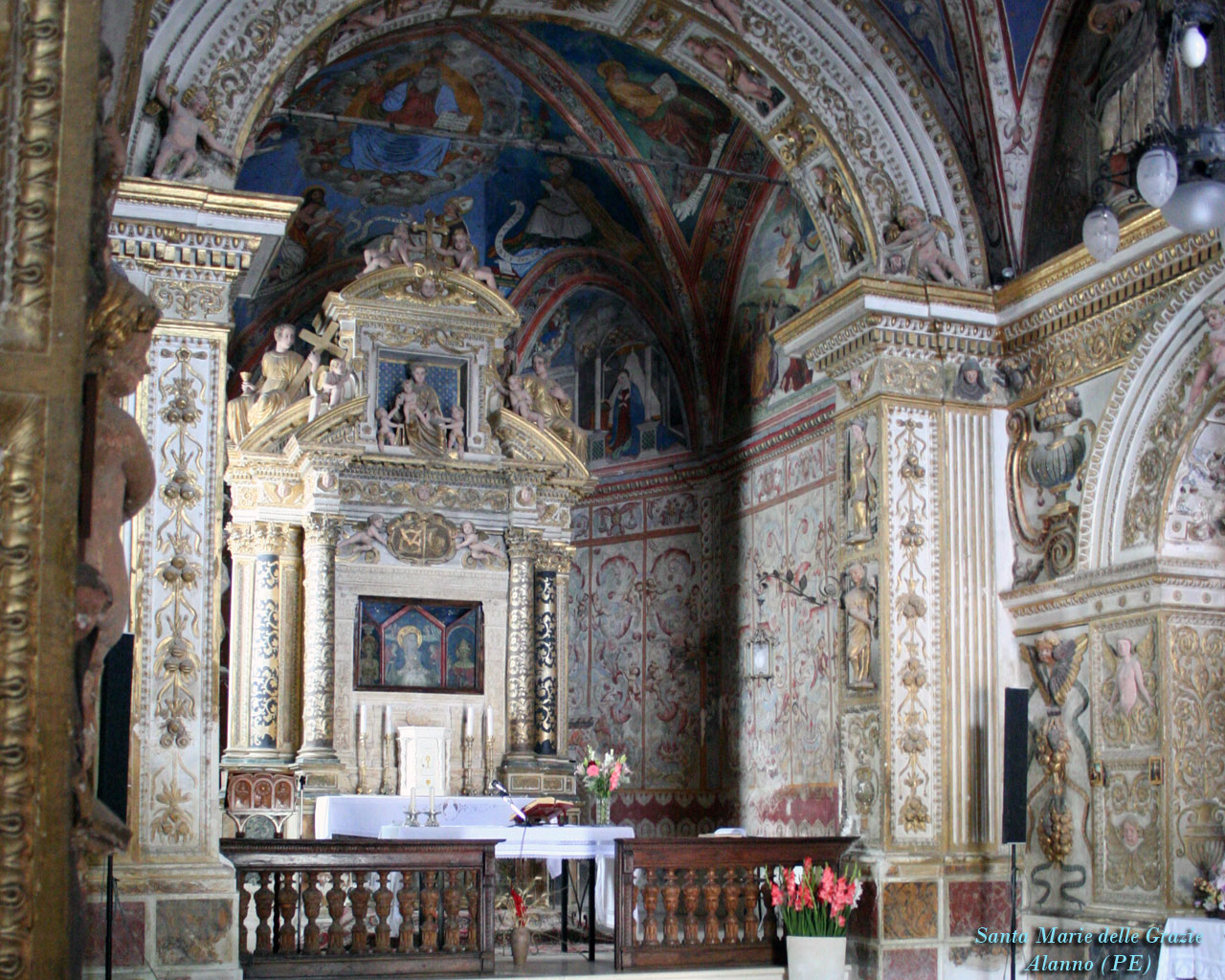
Interior of the Church of Santa Maria delle Grazie

The most important landmark of Alanno is the Renaissance church of Santa Maria delle Grazie, built around 1485, it was said that the Madonna appeared to a shepherd and asked him to organize the building of a church on that position overlooking the valley. The church was built 3 kilometres (2 mi) outside the town. It has an elegant portal (1505) surmounted by a lunette with a fresco of the Deposition. The single nave ends with an apse with frescoes attributed to Andrea De Litio's workshop (1522) and a 15th-century triptych with Madonna, Angels and Saints. The decoration of the interior is otherwise in Baroque style. The altar, finished in 1642, has a precious 15th century triptych with the Madonna between St. Sebastian and a Holy Pope.

Other points of interest include the three towers, remains of the medieval walls and castle, the 16th century church of St. Francis and the Wildlife Oasis of Alanno, characterized by numerous birds species and a rich river vegetation.
