= Turrivalignani =

- Comune
- Comune di Turrivalignani
- Location within Italy Location within Abruzzo
- Coordinates: 42°16′N 14°2′E
- Country: Italy
- Region: Abruzzo
- Province: Pescara (PE)
- Frazioni: Pescarina

Area
  - Total: 6 km^{2} (2.3 sq mi)
- Elevation: 312 m (1,024 ft)

Population (1 January 2007)
  - Total: 845
  - Density: 140/km^{2} (360/sq mi)
- Demonym: Turresi
- Time zone: UTC+1 (CET)
  - Summer (DST): UTC+2 (CEST)
- Postal code: 65020
- Dialing code: 085
- ISTAT code: 068044

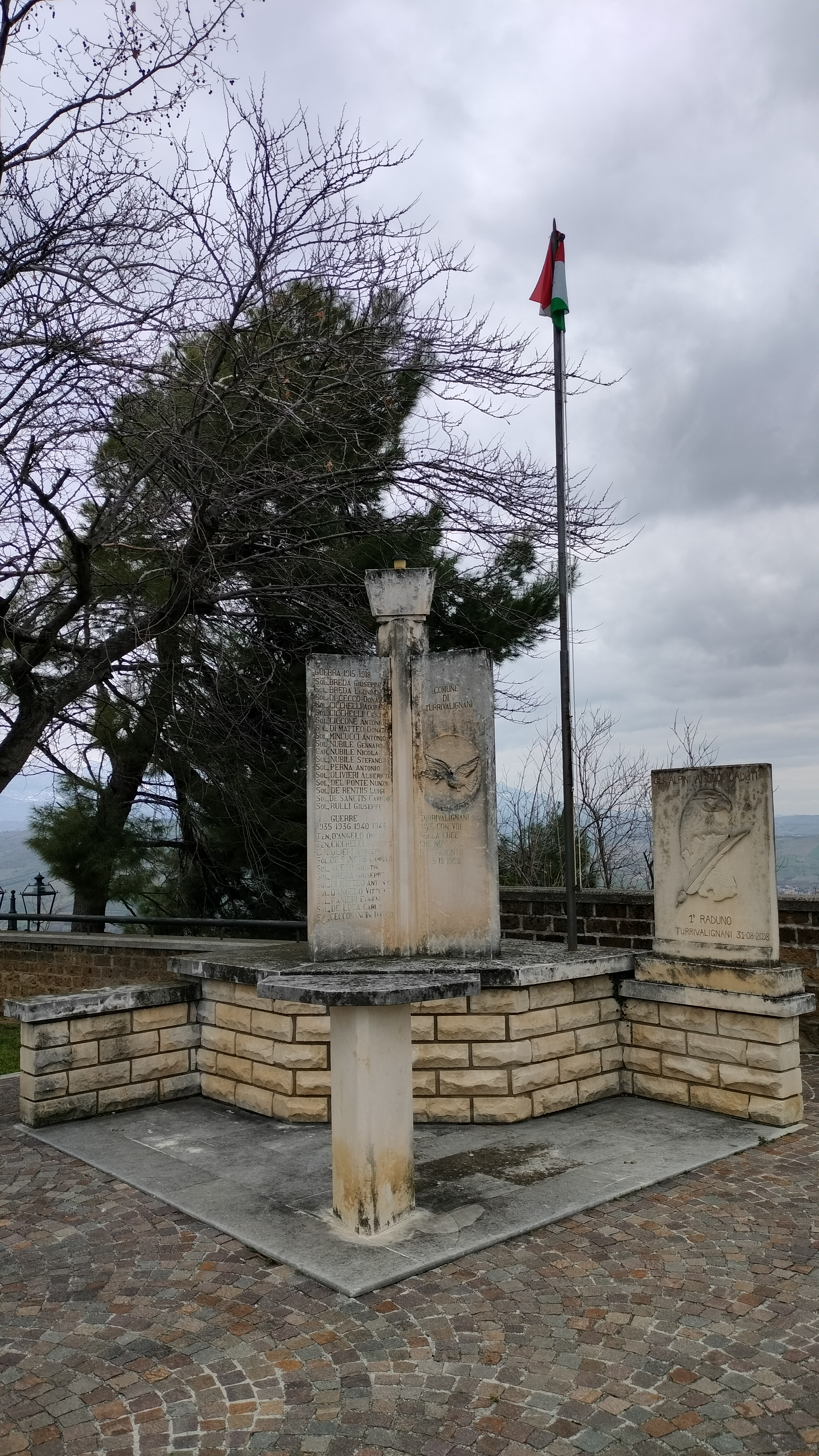
The neighbourhood of Turrivalignani, Italy

Turrivalignani is a comune and town in the Province of Pescara in the Abruzzo region of Italy.
