= Pianella =

- Comune
- Città di Pianella
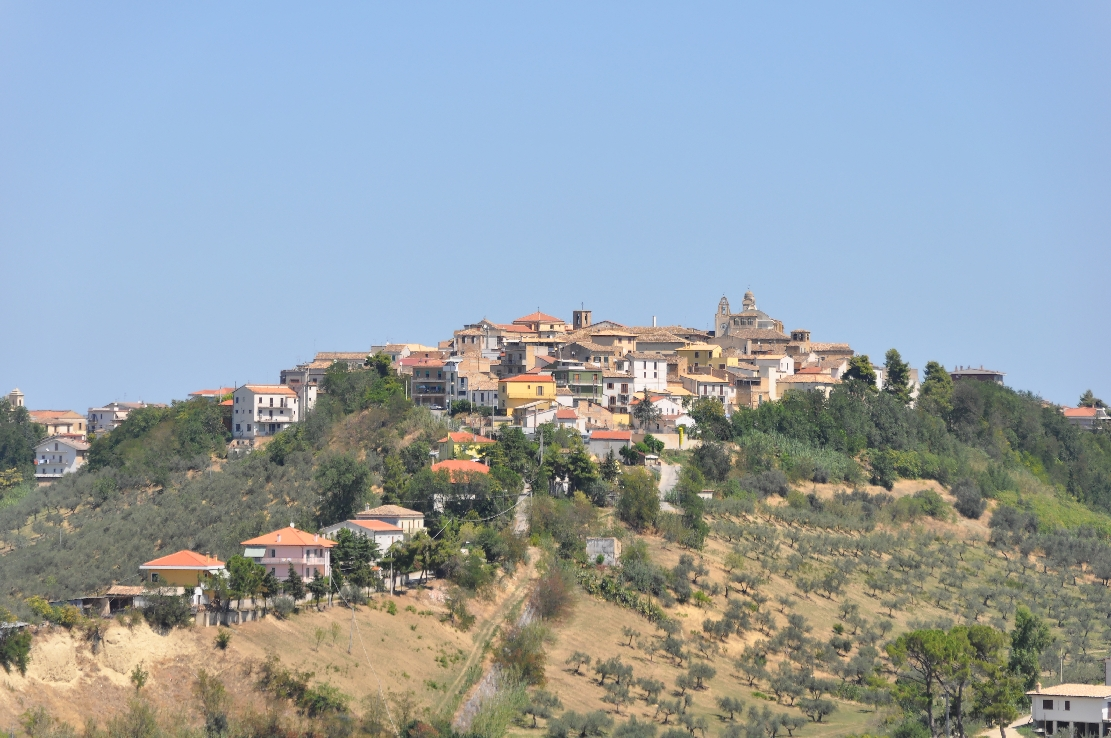
- View of Pianella

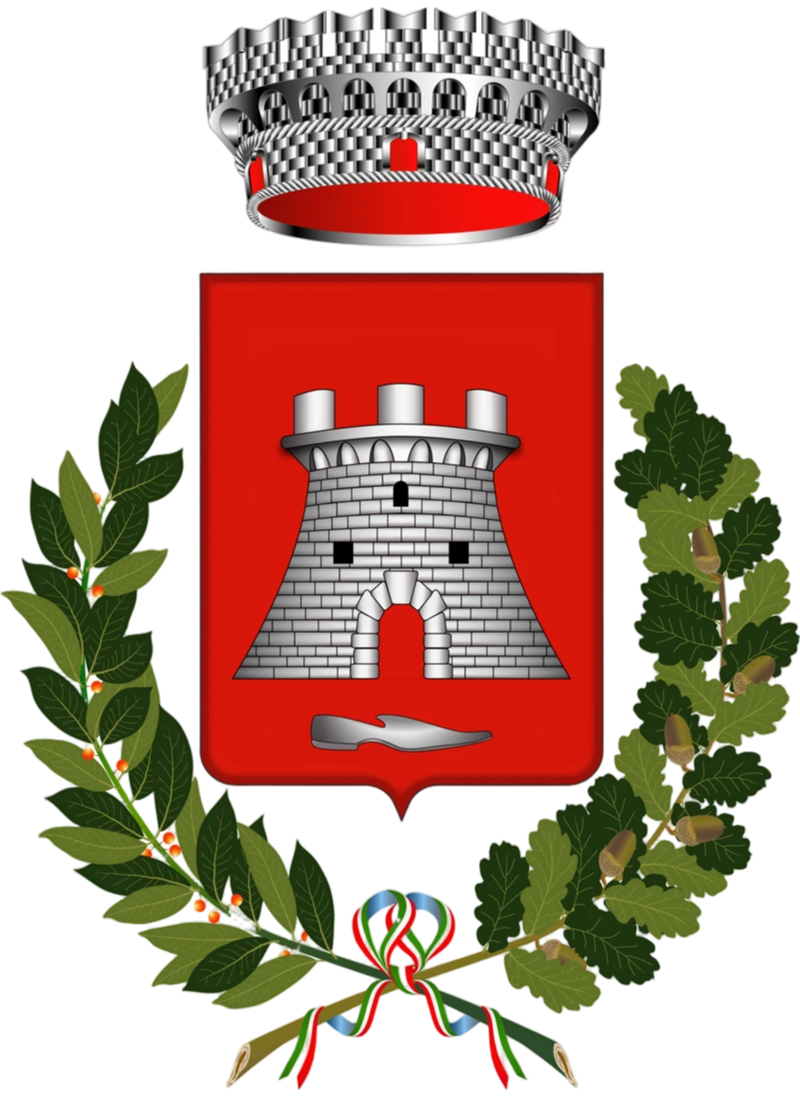
- Coat of arms

- Location within Italy Location within Abruzzo
- Coordinates: 42°24′N 14°3′E
- Country: Italy
- Region: Abruzzo
- Province: Pescara (PE)
- Frazioni: Castellana di Pianella, Cerratina di Pianella

Area
  - Total: 46 km^{2} (18 sq mi)
- Elevation: 236 m (774 ft)

Population (May 31, 2007)
  - Total: 7,961
  - Density: 170/km^{2} (450/sq mi)
- Demonym: Pianellesi
- Time zone: UTC+1 (CET)
  - Summer (DST): UTC+2 (CEST)
- Postal code: 65019
- Dialing code: 085
- ISTAT code: 068030
- Patron saint: San Silvestro
- Saint day: last Sunday in July
- Website: Official website

Pianella (locally Pianòlle) is a comune and town in the Province of Pescara in the Abruzzo region of Italy.
