= Museo delle Genti d'Abruzzo =

Coordinates: 42.4621°N 14.2133°E

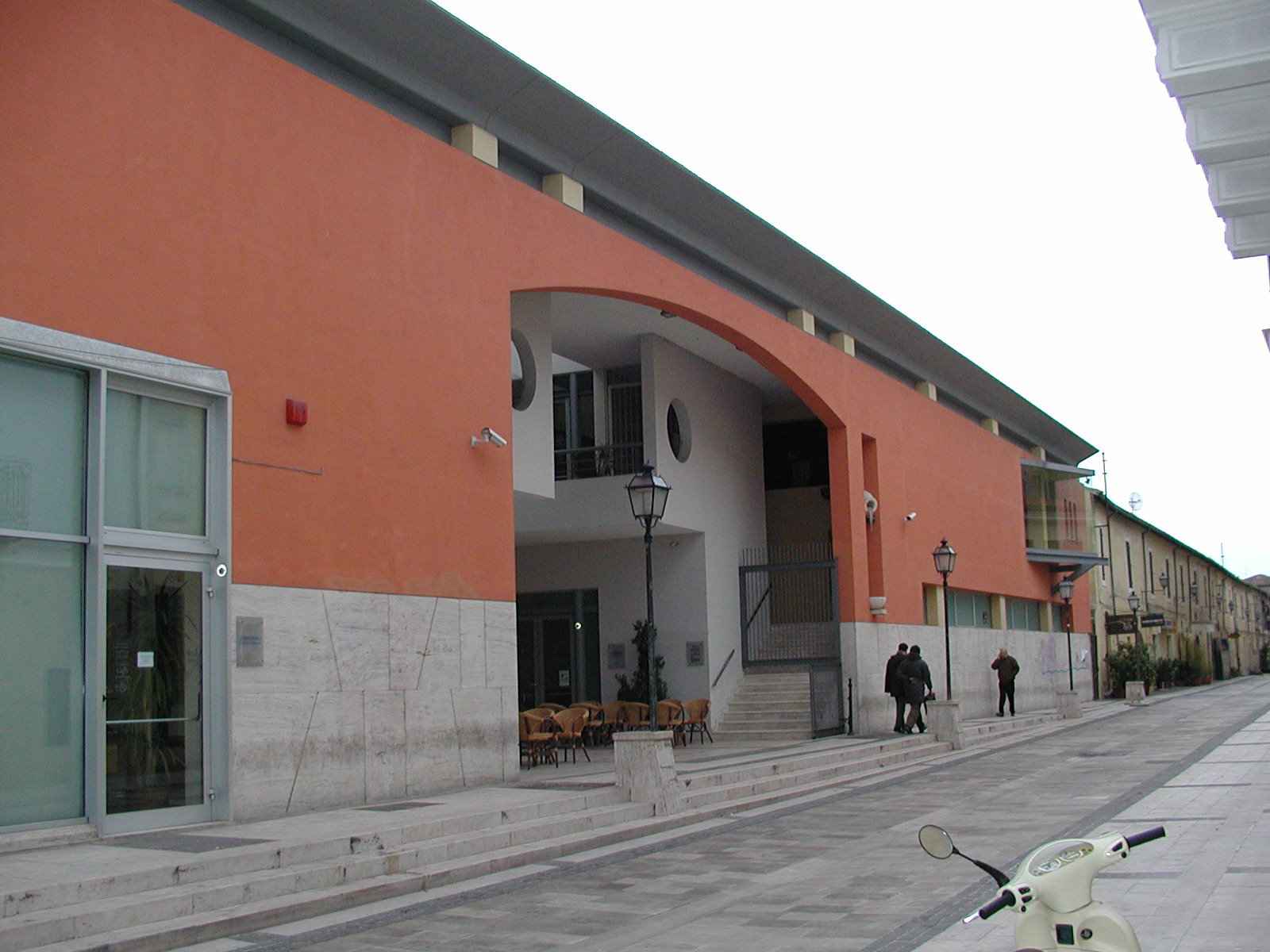
- Museo delle genti d'Abruzzo
- Location: Pescara
- Type: Ethnographic Museum
- Website: http://www.gentidabruzzo.it/

Museo delle genti d'Abruzzo (Italian for Museum of the people of Abruzzo) is an ethnographic Museum in Pescara, Abruzzo.

== History ==
The museum is housed in the remaining sections of the fortress of Pescara, constructed starting in the 16th century. The visible part of this section is the Bourbon penal bath on Via delle Caserme. The museum officially opened in 1973 with exhibitions on the lower floor of the Birthplace of Gabriele D'Annunzio Museum. In 1982, most of the collection was donated to the municipality of Pescara, which inaugurated the museum at its current location on March 13, 1998. In the early 2000s, the monumental arch on Via delle Caserme was reconstructed in a modern style, including the Literary Café. Before the 1943 bombing, a large access arch from the river, the only remaining element of the ancient entrance gates to Pescara from the fortress, stood near the barracks.

== Collection ==
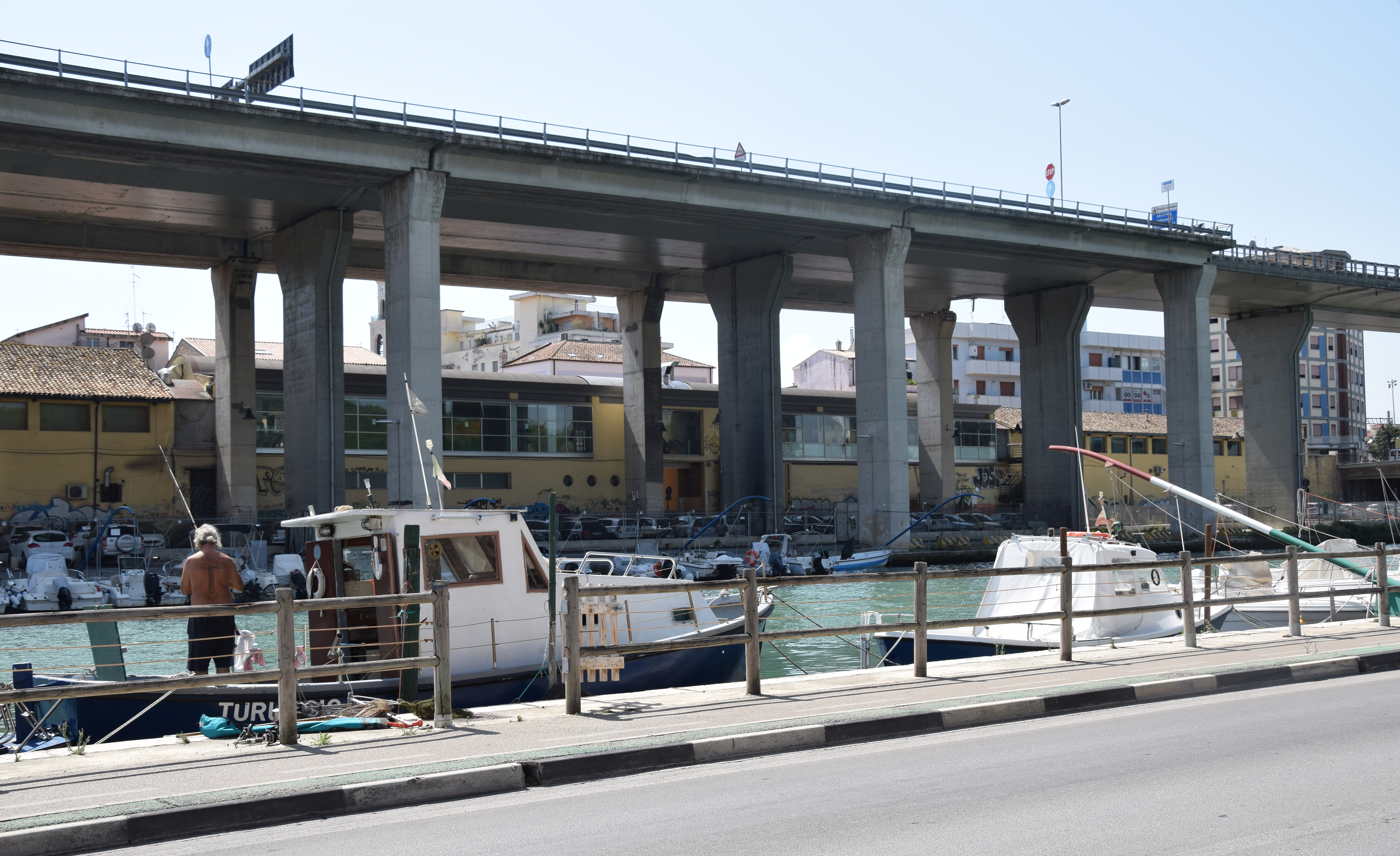
The building's view of the river

Inside, the museum contains artifacts and testimonies of life in Abruzzo, from Prehistory to the Industrial Revolution.

Of interest, located next to the atrium with the ticket office, is a small museum of the ancient Spanish fortress or "Real Piazza di Pescara", which later (the Via delle Caserme section) became a penal bath during the Bourbon era. The visible rooms show ancient prisons used for political prisoners opposing the Bourbons, including Clemente de Caesaris, a liberal and patriot from Abruzzo. The rooms are very simple, with barrel vaults, some preserved period cannons, and reproductions of the plans of the ancient fortress of Pescara, whose bastions were demolished or buried to allow the city to develop.

Part of the floor has been excavated to show how the ancient settlements of Aterno or Portanuova were constantly refortified over the centuries, from the Byzantines to the Normans to the Caldora family, leaving traces of the ancient Roman settlement, with remnants of underground mosaics.

=== Room I “Antonio Mario Radmilli” - Archaeology from Prehistory to the Middle Ages ===
Contains traces of prehistoric humans in Abruzzo (tools, pottery, tombs,...) and from ancient times (armor, weapons, iron,...).

The oldest artifacts date back 100,000 years, found in various archaeological areas of Abruzzo, mainly in caves at the foot of the Maiella and Gran Sasso, such as the Piccioni cave in Bolognano, the cave of Montebello di Bertona, or the archaeological area of Contrada Svolte di Popoli. The room reconstructs the Neolithic period in Abruzzo, when humans began to stop living in caves, which were instead used as crypts and tombs, and started practicing agriculture and animal husbandry; many tools for work in the countryside from this period are preserved. Moving to the Metal Age and then to the Italic peoples, funerary items, tombs, and skeletons found around Penne (PE) are preserved, including domestic objects, weapons, and armor for men, showing the evolution of this art, influenced by the Romans and Greeks.

=== Room II - Sacredness of caves and continuity of places of worship ===
Contains the reproduction of a cave, with artifacts from prehistoric, barbaric, and Christian beliefs.

The room reconstructs the history of Christian worship that supplanted the Italic-Roman one in the Piccioni cave in Bolognano, with objects from the 8th century found, such as vases; the highlight of the collection is the medieval statue of Saint Michael the Archangel, from the hermitage of Sant'Angelo in Lettomanoppello. Saint Angelo became the quintessential saint in Abruzzo during the Lombard era, with churches, statues, and caves dedicated to him. The room uses exhibition panels to illustrate the most ancestral votive cults dedicated to the saint in Abruzzo, such as the ritual of rubbing oneself on the water-bearing rock of the hermitage of San Michele in Liscia (CH) or the hermitage of Sant'Onofrio in Serramonacesca (PE).

=== Room III - Continuity of sacred rites and material culture ===
Focuses on the theme of continuity (of everyday objects, magic and rituals, shapes and decorations, cults, and traditional festivals) over the centuries in Abruzzo.

The material found in various late Lombard churches in the Val Pescara dates back to the 8th-9th centuries. The highlight is a votive wooden box with various stylized friezes of geometric and plant elements, including a kind of heart, used as the logo of the Museum of the People of Abruzzo. Among these motifs also appears the prototype of the Abruzzese jewel called the Presentosa. Other exhibition panels show other festivals dedicated to the cult of "regeneration" in Abruzzo, always dedicated to Saint Michael, such as the end of September fires, bonfires, but also sacred fire rituals that somehow connect to ancient pagan purification rites, such as the Farchie of Fara Filiorum Petri. For the Lent period, the room displays typical Abruzzese sweets prepared for Easter, such as dolls, horses, and other anthropomorphic or animal figures, depending on the province.

=== Room IV - The Shepherd and His Kit ===
Contains a stylized reproduction of a flock of sheep and some objects that the shepherd created during his workdays.

Interesting reconstructions of the typical pastoral environment on a mountain plateau like Campo Imperatore, with mannequins depicting shepherds in their costumes, sheep, stazzi, and stone tholos huts. Fascinating are wooden instruments made by the shepherds, showcasing their craftsmanship. These objects include milking stools, razor boxes, grooming tools, bagpipes, and ciaramellas. These items, along with writings on notebooks, belong to the Abruzzese shepherd poet Francesco Giuliani, known as "Cicche ru Cuaprare", and demonstrate that shepherds were not just simple traveling farmers but artisans who expressed a certain originality in their art.

Further confirmation of this craft, as testified by historians and folklorists such as De Nino, Finamore, and Pansa, lies in the fact that shepherds from the 16th-17th centuries entertained themselves during their gatherings on the tratturi by telling or composing chivalric poems about the exploits of Charlemagne and the Paladins or Roland from Ariosto's poem, or recounting the exploits of Goffredo d'Altavilla and Tancredi in Torquato Tasso's poem. The museum room preserves personal diaries of shepherds containing poems and original poetry in dialect and language. The pastoral poetry activity is well documented in the Sagittario Valley, where an unpublished chivalric poem about the exploits of Charlemagne, the wizard Pietro Bailardo, and the witch Angelica was also found.

=== Room V - The Stone Hut. Transhumance, settlements, and wool production. ===
Through some panels and objects, it narrates the history of shepherding and transhumance over the centuries.

Reconstructions of tholos stone huts, with stones interlocked to form a rough night shelter, are shown. Many of these huts are found near Abbateggio and Bolognano in the Val Pescara. Of interest are also land concession diplomas signed by King Ferdinand II of the Two Sicilies, indicating that Abruzzese shepherds, during their journey from L'Aquila to Foggia, often had to stop in non-owned lands.

=== Room VI - Shelters, Herds, and Cheese Production. ===
This room contains a reproduction of a typical Abruzzo dry-stone hut, known as a “tholos”, along with its typical furnishings.

Many displayed tools, such as "lu callàre" (the cauldron), demonstrate how shepherds cooked during the transhumance periods, in the resting areas of the herds.

=== Room VII - Wheat: from Seed to Flour. ===
This room is dedicated to the activities in the fields related to wheat. It explains, through objects and panels, the various phases of processing (Sowing and Plowing, Harvesting and Threshing, Ventilation and Cleaning of the wheat) and the life of farmers in the fields.

=== Room VIII - From the Olive Grove to Olive Oil. ===
This room contains the means of transport for moving goods over land (animals and hand transportation), and the olive harvesting.

=== Room IX - The Vine and Wine. ===
This room narrates the traditions related to wine and the vine, as well as Abruzzo traditions related to the pig. Many display panels help show how, especially in the past, the pig was a true source of wealth for farmers, and the occasions during the year when the pig was slaughtered, butchered, and cooked, especially for the feast of Saint Anthony the Abbot.

=== Room X - The House: Furnishings, Structure, and Domestic Life. ===
This room explains what a typical Abruzzo farmhouse looked like.

The room is very interesting for its period photographs of some country farmhouses, as well as for the reconstruction of a real internal rural Abruzzo environment, with the kitchen on the ground floor, complete with all utensils, and the first floor used as a grooming area and bedroom. By reading the uses and customs of Abruzzo by De Nino and the Popular Traditions of Abruzzo by Finamore, it is evident that in the countryside, due to the small space, every centimeter of the walls was occupied by useful objects for daily life, given that the woman mostly stayed at home tidying up and preparing lunch and dinner for her husband who went hunting or worked the land.

=== Room XI - Linen and Wool: Production, Spinning, and Weaving. ===
This room contains some traditional machines and explains through panels the processing of these two animal fibers.

=== Room XII - Clothing and Ornaments: from Everyday to Ceremonial. ===
This room features an exhibition of traditional Abruzzo clothing. The journey starts with the oldest testimonies from the 16th-17th century up to the early 20th century. The typical Abruzzo costumes are shown, especially those of women, taking inspiration from the larger collection of the Museo del costume abruzzese in Sulmona (AQ), such as the models of the costume of Scanno, Pettorano sul Gizio, and Introdacqua, to name the most famous. A replica of the Abruzzo costume woven by the women of Pescocostanzo for Duchess Margherita of Austria, lady of several Abruzzo fiefs, is presented.

The panels explain the typical trousseaus of women on the occasion of marriage, Holy Week, a funeral, a birth, and for everyday use. Additionally, some 18th-century prints, some of which are taken from the Museo del costume abruzzese in Sulmona, illustrate the cataloging of the different costumes for both men and women for each municipality of the current Abruzzo, from the province of L'Aquila to that of Chieti and Teramo. Following this, the typical Abruzzo wedding jewelry, the Presentosa, prepared in the villages of the Maiella and the Sagittario Valley, and rings called "manucce" are shown, moving on to simpler clothing for men and women in the early 20th century, characterized by white and black.

=== Room XIII - Maiolica. ===
This room contains an exhibition of typical Abruzzo maiolica, explaining the production and the most famous manufacturers in Abruzzo. Many pieces come from the Collection of Raffaele Paparella Treccia and from the Museum of Ceramics of Villa Urania in Pescara. However, other pieces come from private collections in Castelli, Anversa degli Abruzzi, Rapino, and Torre de' Passeri. Some pieces are of notable importance, coming from the same workshops of the Grue and Gentili families of Castelli, others from Fedele Cappelletti and the Vitacolonna family of Rapino, showing a different chromatic style from the brighter and more vivid ones of Castelli; the ceramics of Anversa and Torre dei Passeri are characterized by the blue tone over the white porcelain glaze.
