= Vicoli =

- Comune
- Comune di Vicoli
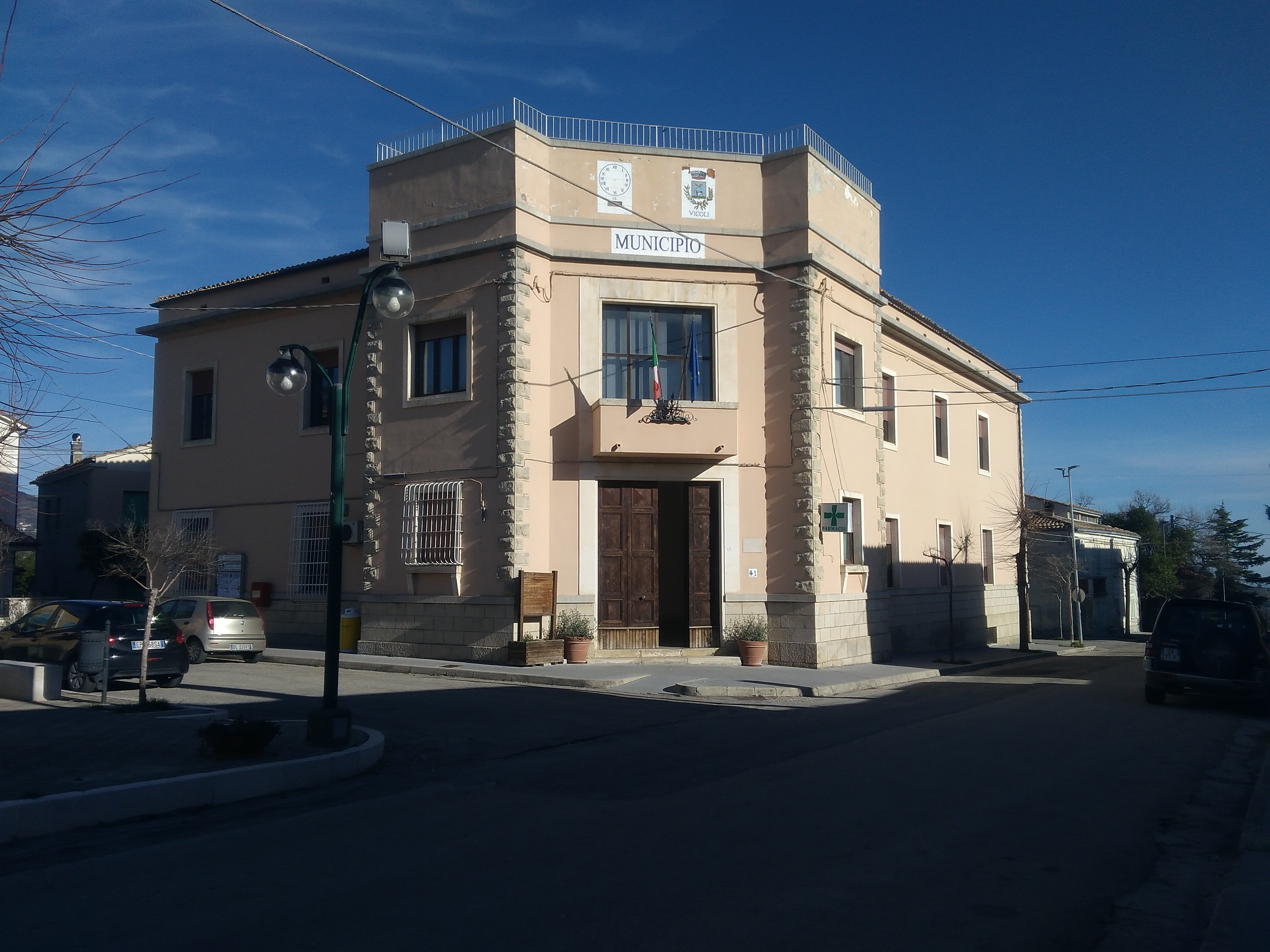
- Town hall

- Location within Italy Location within Abruzzo
- Coordinates: 42°20′N 13°53′E
- Country: Italy
- Region: Abruzzo
- Province: Pescara (PE)
- Frazioni: De Contra, La Penna, Le Pietre, Piano Vanardi

Government
  - Mayor: Catia Campobasso (since 2019)

Area
  - Total: 9 km^{2} (3.5 sq mi)
- Elevation: 445 m (1,460 ft)

Population (2024)
  - Total: 379
  - Density: 42/km^{2} (110/sq mi)
- Time zone: UTC+1 (CET)
  - Summer (DST): UTC+2 (CEST)
- Postal code: 65010
- Dialing code: 085
- ISTAT code: 068045
- Patron saint: San Rocco
- Saint day: August 16

Vicoli is a comune and town in the Province of Pescara in the Abruzzo region of Italy 41 kilometres (25 mi) from the provincial capital of Pescara.

The first documents about the village of Vicoli date back to the year 883, when the place was mentioned as Curtis de Viculo and to 1112 when the name was Castellum de Vicula. In the 15th century it was a feud of Francesco de Riccardis, then it belonged to the city of Chieti, to Francesco de Paganis, Manfredino of Valencia and Ferdinando Castriota, whose family retained ownership until 1597, when it was sold to Alfonso Piccolomini.

The ruins of a bastioned castle, dating from the 15th century and probably owned by the Acquaviva family, still seem to dominate it in their devastating fragility. It was once surrounded by walls and protected by access doors.
