= Province of Pescara =

Coordinates: 42°27′50″N 14°12′51″E

Province of Pescara Provincia di Pescara (Italian) Pruvìngie de Pescàre (Abruzzese)
- Province
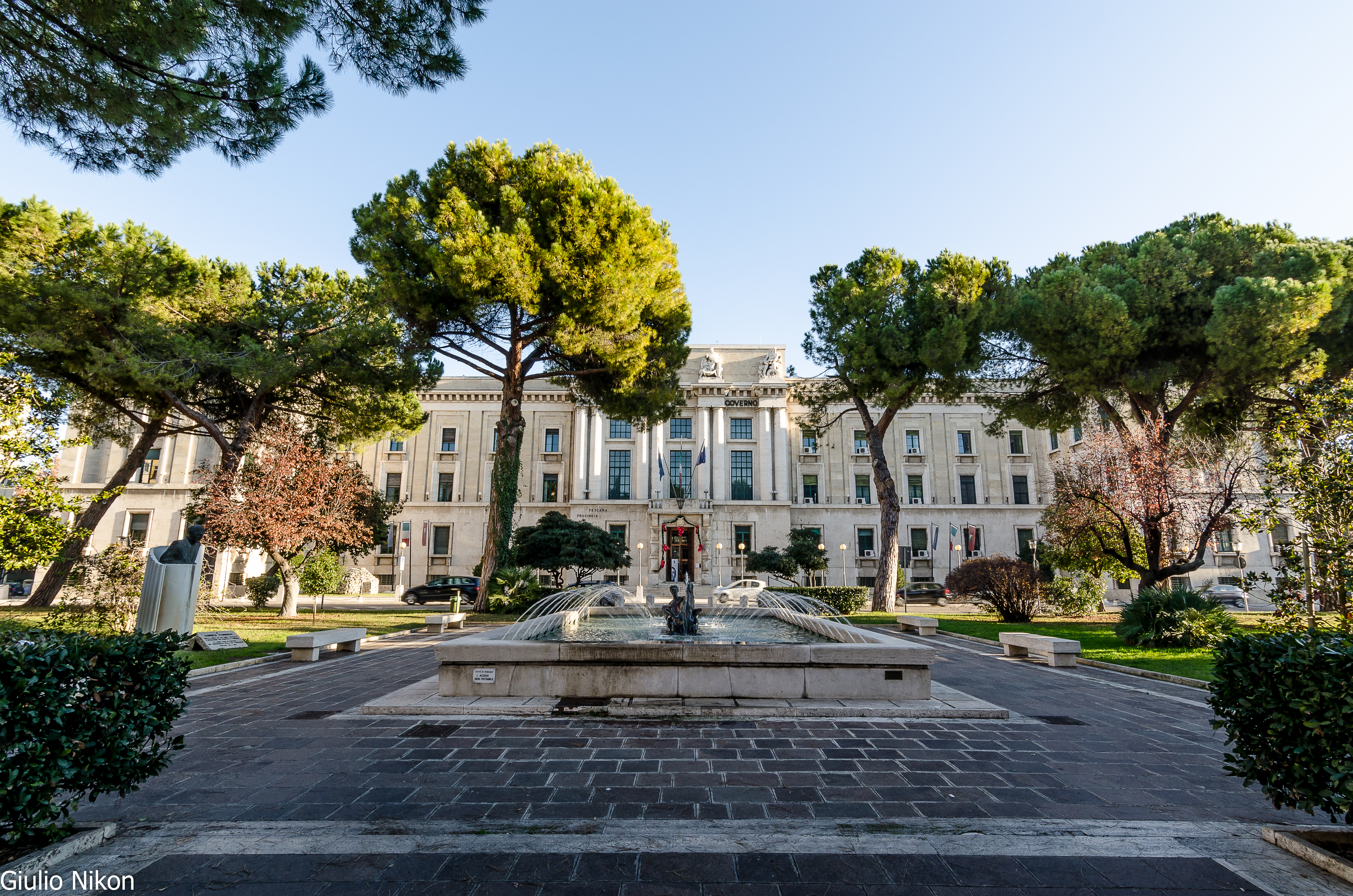
- Palazzo del Governo, the provincial seat at Pescara

- Flag Coat of arms
- Motto: SIBI VALET ET VIVIT (Latin) "Has in itself the strength to live and prosper"
- Location of the province of Pescara in Italy
- Country: Italy
- Region: Abruzzo
- Capital: Pescara
- Municipalities: 46

Government
  - President: Giorgio De Luca

Area
  - Total: 1,230.33 km^{2} (475.03 sq mi)

Population (2026)
  - Total: 311,563
  - Density: 253.235/km^{2} (655.876/sq mi)

GDP
  - Total: €7.764 billion (2015)
  - Per capita: €24,084 (2015)
- Time zone: UTC+1 (CET)
  - Summer (DST): UTC+2 (CEST)
- Postal code: 65010-65014, 65016-65017, 65019-65020, 65022-65024, 65026-65029
- Telephone prefix: 085
- Vehicle registration: PE
- ISTAT code: 068
- Website: Official website

The Province of Pescara (Italian: provincia di Pescara; Abruzzese: pruvìngie de Pescàre) is a province in the region of Abruzzo in southern Italy. Its capital is the city of Pescara.

The province has a total population of 311,563 in an area of 1,230.33 square kilometres (475.03 mi^{2}) across its 46 municipalities. The provincial president is Giorgio De Luca.

== History ==
Pescara's first indicators of settlement date to 1500 BCE, but it is unknown which tribe first settled in the city. It was conquered by the Romans in 214 BCE and remained "Aternum" after the city allied itself with Punic Carthaginian military commander Hannibal. The Romans developed the city and it became an important location for shipping and trade occurring between the Balkans and Rome; the Romans made the city of Pescara the capital of the Valeria region. During the barbarian raids it was almost completely destroyed, and it developed into a fishing village named Piscaria.

Charles V, Holy Roman Emperor turned Piscaria into a military fort named Pescara during the sixteenth century, and Pescara survived a series of invasions from Turkish Muslims. It was ruled by the Austrians for a short period of the 1700s before falling under the control of the House of Bourbon; the House of Bourbon made it a component of Abruzzo Citra. It joined the Kingdom of Italy in 1860 and was still mainly fortified and Pescara was made a new provincial capital in 1927. In World War II, 78% of the city was destroyed by bombers.

== Geography ==
The province of Pescara is the central of four provinces in the region of Abruzzo on the eastern coast of Italy. It is bounded to the northeast by the Adriatic Sea. The Province of Teramo lies to the north and the Province of L'Aquila to the west and south. To the south and east lies the Province of Chieti. The provincial capital is the city and port of Pescara, situated at the mouth of the Aterno-Pescara River.

=== Municipalities ===
The province has 46 municipalities:

- Abbateggio
- Alanno
- Bolognano
- Brittoli
- Bussi sul Tirino
- Cappelle sul Tavo
- Caramanico Terme
- Carpineto della Nora
- Castiglione a Casauria
- Catignano
- Cepagatti
- Città Sant'Angelo
- Civitaquana
- Civitella Casanova
- Collecorvino
- Corvara
- Cugnoli
- Elice
- Farindola
- Lettomanoppello
- Loreto Aprutino
- Manoppello
- Montebello di Bertona
- Montesilvano
- Moscufo
- Nocciano
- Penne
- Pescara
- Pescosansonesco
- Pianella
- Picciano
- Pietranico
- Popoli
- Roccamorice
- Rosciano
- Salle
- San Valentino in Abruzzo Citeriore
- Sant'Eufemia a Maiella
- Scafa
- Serramonacesca
- Spoltore
- Tocco da Casauria
- Torre de' Passeri
- Turrivalignani
- Vicoli
- Villa Celiera

== Demographics ==
Historical population
Year	Pop.	±%
1861	128,409	—
1871	135,391	+5.4%
1881	138,005	+1.9%
1901	160,986	+16.7%
1911	173,042	+7.5%
1921	177,383	+2.5%
1931	196,431	+10.7%
1936	211,561	+7.7%
1951	239,817	+13.4%
1961	242,958	+1.3%
1971	264,981	+9.1%
1981	286,240	+8.0%
1991	289,534	+1.2%
2001	295,481	+2.1%
2011	314,661	+6.5%
2021	313,631	−0.3%
Source: ISTAT

As of 2026, the population is 311,563, of which 48.5% are male, and 51.5% are female. Minors make up 14.5% of the population, and seniors make up 25.7%.

=== Immigration ===
As of 2025, immigrants make up 10.3% of the population. The 5 largest foreign countries of birth are Romania, Venezuela, Albania, Ukraine, and Switzerland.

== Main sights ==
=== Pescara ===
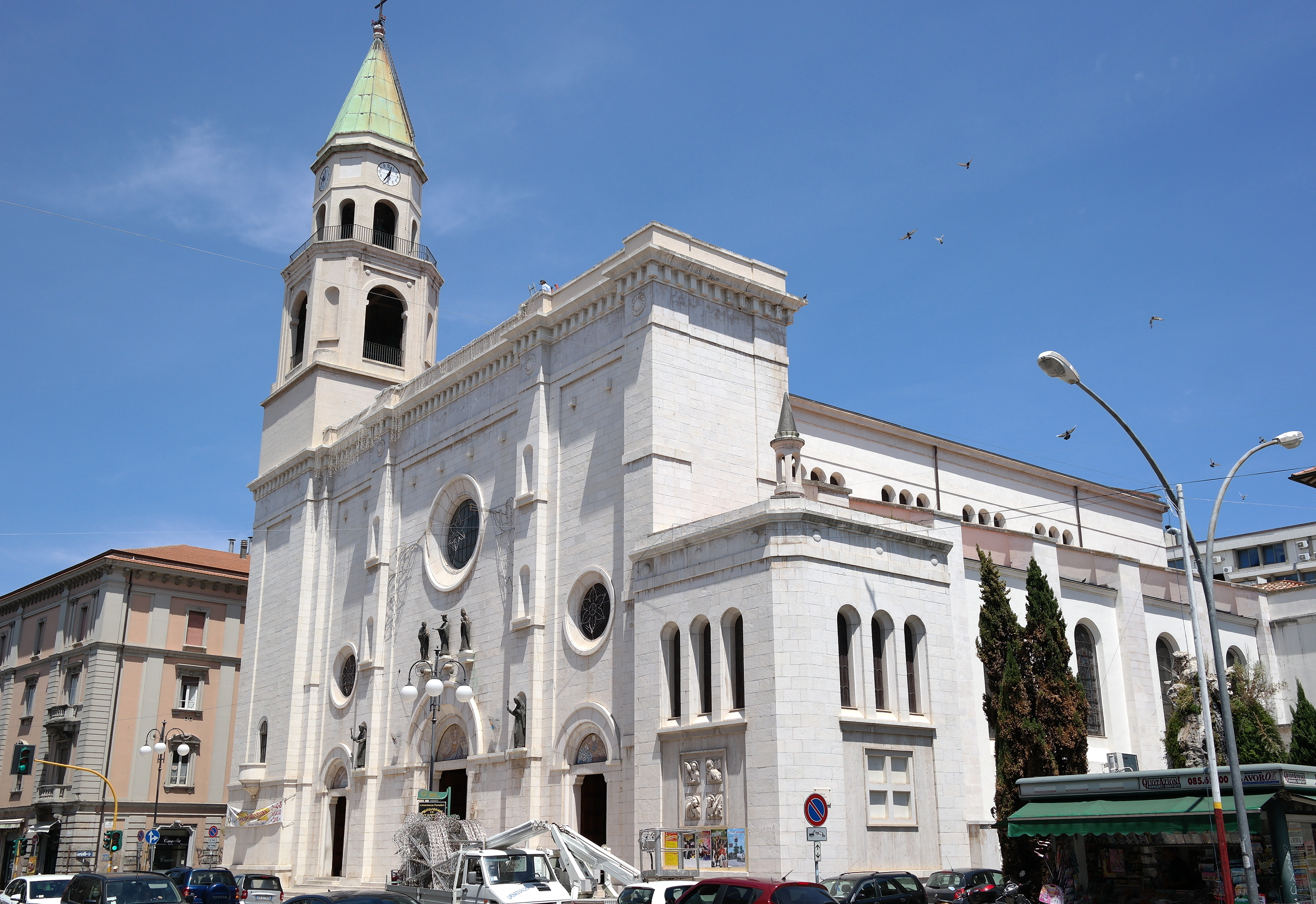
Pescara Cathedral

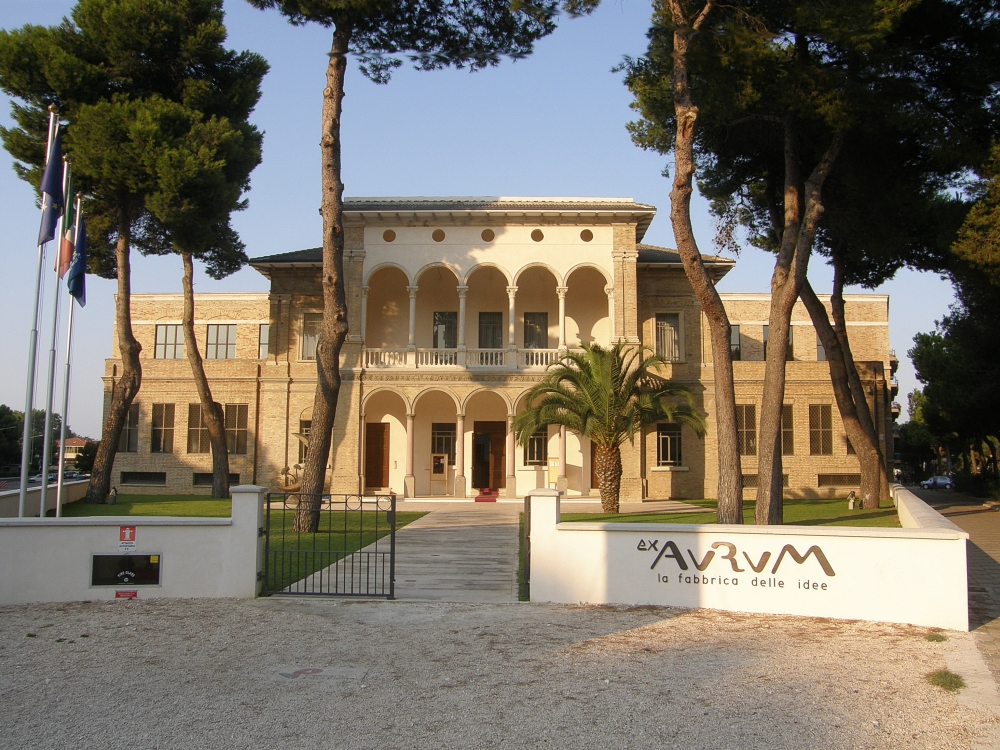
Aurum building

The city is divided in two by the river.

The historic city center is located on the south shore, where once stood the Piazzaforte (fortified town), a military bulwark of the Kingdom of the Two Sicilies. There is the Bagno Borbonico (the old prison of the Kingdom of the Two Sicilies, built starting in 1510 by order of Charles V, which incorporated inside the remains of the Norman and Byzantine city walls). Today it houses the Museum of the Abruzzi people: the institution traces, towards 13 halls dedicated to the aspects of life, traditions and economy, 4,000 years of history of the Abruzzo people.

In the historic city center are the birthplace houses of Gabriele D'Annunzio and Ennio Flaiano, and the San Cetteo Cathedral, build between 1933 and 1938.

On the north shore of the river there's Piazza Italia (Italy Square), overlooked by the City Hall and the Government Building (which houses the headquarters of the province of Pescara), both built during the Fascist era according to the fascist rationalist style and designed by the architect Vincenzo Pilotti. Pilotti designed the majority of the public buildings of the city, including the seat of the local Chamber of Commerce, of the Liceo Classico "G. D'Annunzio" high school, and the old seat of the court (which now houses a museum).

In the very south part of the city, between the D'Avalos Park and the beach, there is an elegant Art Nouveau villas district designed in 1912 by Antonino Liberi (an engineer brother-in-law of D'Annunzio). There is also the Aurum, first headquarters of a social club (called the Kursaal), then liquor factory, and today public multipurpose space.

In 2007 was built the Ponte del Mare, the largest pedestrian and cycle bridge in Italy.

On the northern waterfront, close to the Salotto Square, the main square of the city, there is the Nave (trad. the ship), a sculpture by Pietro Cascella.

=== National Park of Majella ===
- Abbey of San Clemente (Castiglione a Casauria)
- Abbey of San Liberatore (Serramonacesca)
- Hermitage of Sant'Onofrio (Serramonacesca)
- Hermitage of Santo Spirito (Serramonacesca)
- Hermitage of San Bartolomeo (Roccamorice)
- Basilica of Holy Draw of Manoppello
- Historical center of Penne
- Historical center of Loreto Aprutino
- Historical center of Città Sant'Angelo

== See also ==
- Pescara Town Hall
