= Montebello di Bertona =

Comune in Abruzzo, Italy

- Comune
- Comune di Montebello di Bertona
- Coat of arms

- Location within Italy Location within Abruzzo
- Coordinates: 42°25′02″N 13°52′18″E
- Country: Italy
- Region: Abruzzo
- Province: Pescara (PE)
- Frazioni: Campo Bertona, Campo delle Piane, Campo Mirabello, Campo Santa Maria, Colasante

Government
  - Mayor: Gianfranco Macrini

Area
  - Total: 21 km^{2} (8.1 sq mi)
- Elevation: 615 m (2,018 ft)

Population (1 January 2007)
  - Total: 1,067
  - Density: 51/km^{2} (130/sq mi)
- Demonym: Montebellesi
- Time zone: UTC+1 (CET)
  - Summer (DST): UTC+2 (CEST)
- Postal code: 65010
- Dialing code: 085
- Website: Official website

Montebello di Bertona (locally Mundibbèlle) is a comune and town in the province of Pescara, in the Abruzzo region of Italy. It is located in the natural park known as the "Gran Sasso e Monti della Laga National Park".
