= Abbey of San Clemente a Casauria =

Church in Castiglione a Casauria, Italy

Coordinates: 42°14′02″N 13°55′48″E

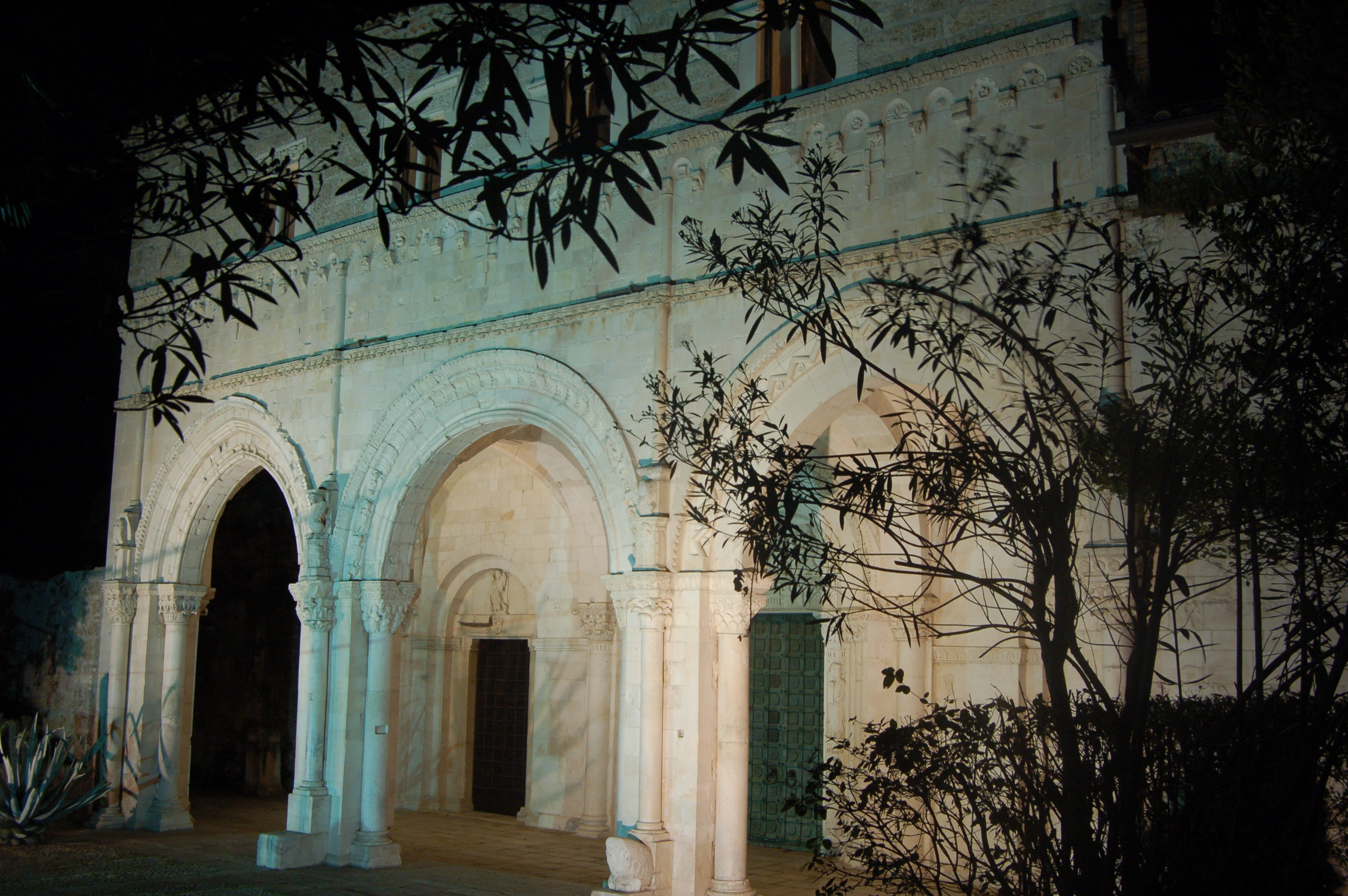
Night view of the abbey church's façade

The abbey of San Clemente a Casauria is an abbey in the territory of Castiglione a Casauria, in the province of Pescara, Abruzzo, Central Italy.

== History ==
The abbey was founded in 871 by Louis II, great-grandson of Charlemagne, after a vow made during his imprisonment in the Duchy of Benevento. Initially named for the Holy Trinity, it was dedicated to St. Clement when the latter's remains were brought there in 872.

In its history the abbey was plundered several times: by the Saracens in 920 and repeatedly by the Norman count Malmozzetto between 1076 and 1097. After this destructive episode, the Benedictine abbot Grimoald promoted the rebuilding of the church, which was reconsecrated in 1105. However, the work ended only in the late 12th century under abbot Leonate (1152–82, cardinal from 1170).

== Architecture ==
The façade is preceded by a portico with columns and capitals; under it are three portals, the middle and larger one having a lintel and a tympanum with sculpted stories of St. Clement and of the abbey's history. In the center of the tympanum is the figure of San Clemente in his Papal clothing, with Saints Fabio and Cornelius at his right side and Abbot Leonate, to his left, presenting a model of the rebuilt abbey to its patron.

The bronze doors were made (in 1191) when Abbot Iole was in charge and are divided into 72 rectangular panels depicting various images such as crosses, abbots, rose patterns and 14 castles (and their estates) that were subjects of the Abbey.

Inside the (now deconsecrated) church there are a beautiful paschal candelabrum and a massive ambo dating from the 11 hundreds.

The configuration is a nave and two aisles with semicircular apse. The high altar is a Palaeo-Christian sepulchre, surmounted by a 14th-century ciborium. Next to this is a large marble casket containing the relics of San Clemente.

In the crypt two apse railings divide the primitive church from that rebuilt by the Benedictines in the 12th century.

== See also ==
- San Liberatore a Maiella
