= Castiglione a Casauria =

- Comune
- Comune di Castiglione a Casauria
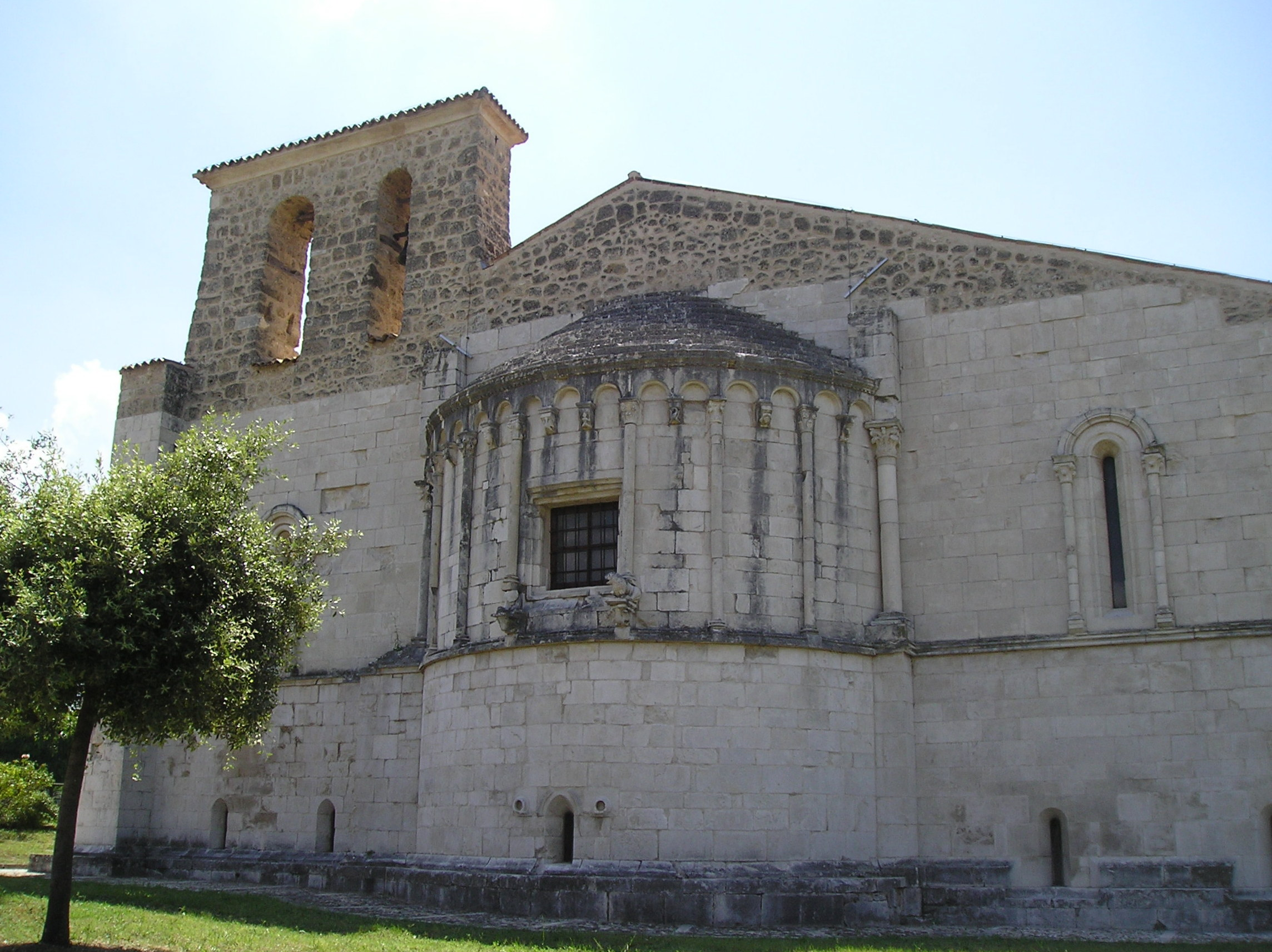
- View of Castiglione a Casauria

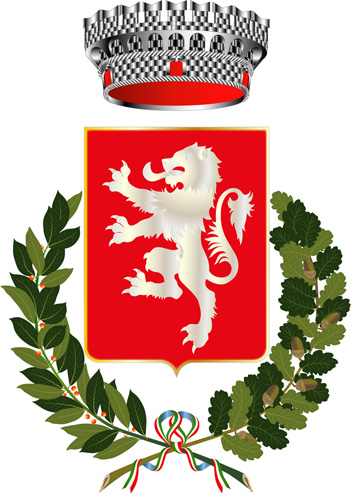
- Coat of arms

- Location within Italy Location within Abruzzo
- Coordinates: 42°14′N 13°54′E
- Country: Italy
- Region: Abruzzo
- Province: Pescara (PE)
- Frazioni: Cervarano, Madonna della Croce, Tocco Castiglione Scalo

Government
  - Mayor: Biagio Piero Petrilli (since 2019) (Crescene Insiere)

Area
  - Total: 16 km^{2} (6.2 sq mi)
- Elevation: 350 m (1,150 ft)

Population (12 May 2024)
  - Total: 713
  - Density: 45/km^{2} (120/sq mi)
- Time zone: UTC+1 (CET)
  - Summer (DST): UTC+2 (CEST)
- Postal code: 65020
- Dialing code: 085

Castiglione a Casauria is a comune and town in the province of Pescara in the Abruzzo region of Italy. It is located in the natural park known as the "Gran Sasso e Monti della Laga National Park".

== Main sights ==
- The Abbey of San Clemente a Casauria, a Romanesque Gothic abbey built by Louis II and dedicated to Saint Clement, as it was said to have temporarily housed the remains of him.
- Palazzo de Petris-Fraggianni

== Twin towns ==
- Hamilton, Canada (since 1992)

== Notable residents ==
- Joseph Felice Nicolai (b. 1910), real estate developer, father of automotive and motorcycle dealer Joseph Pasquale Nicolai. Pasquale funded a park to be built in this town
