= Pescosansonesco =

- Comune
- Comune di Pescosansonesco
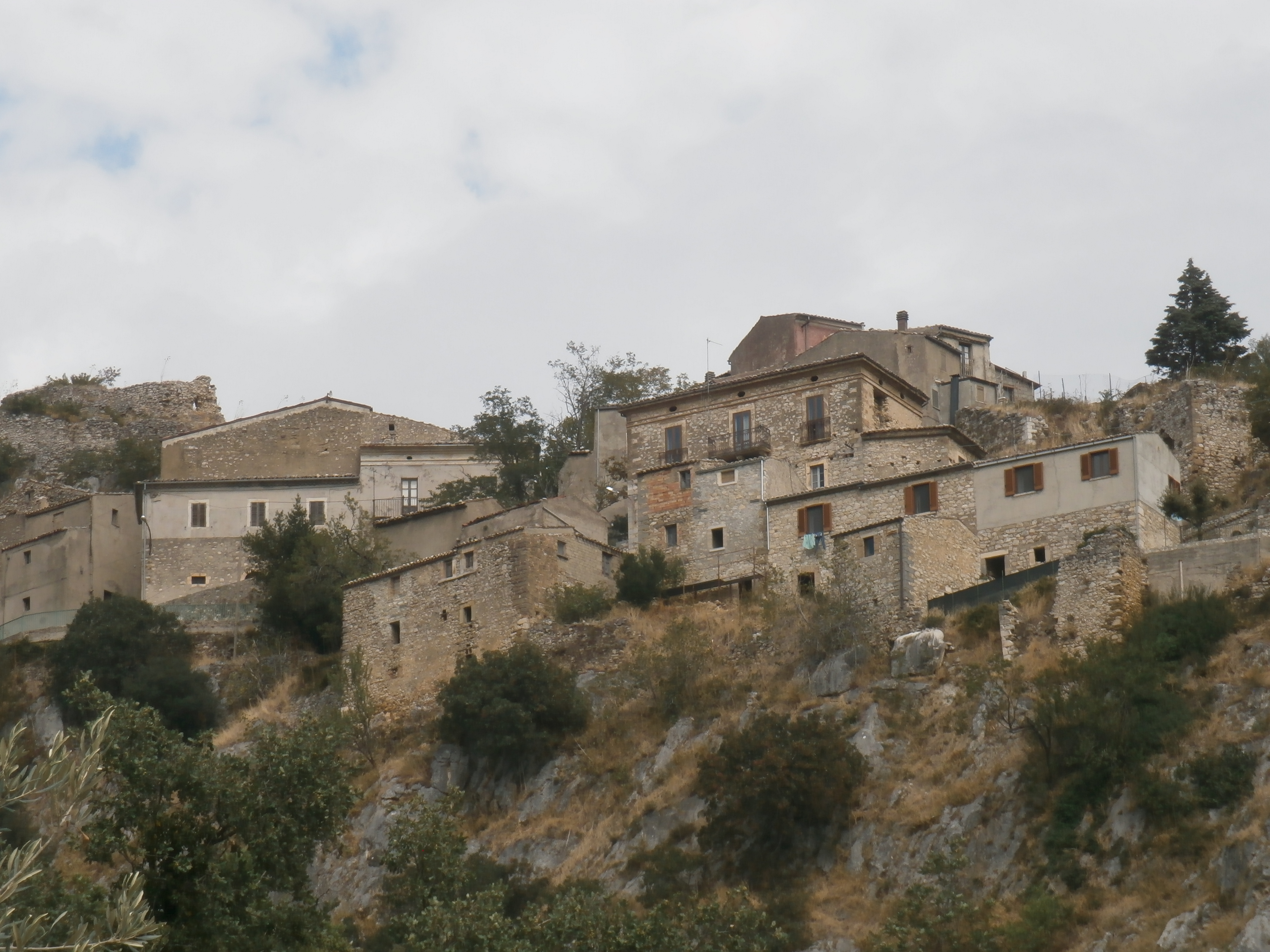
- View of Pescosansonesco

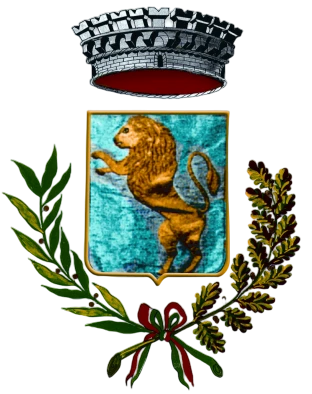
- Coat of arms

- Location within Italy Location within Abruzzo
- Coordinates: 42°15′N 13°53′E
- Country: Italy
- Region: Abruzzo
- Province: Pescara (PE)
- Frazioni: Colle della Guardia, Decontra, Dogli

Government
  - Mayor: Nunzio Di Donato

Area
  - Total: 18.46 km^{2} (7.13 sq mi)
- Elevation: 550 m (1,800 ft)

Population (31 December 2012)
  - Total: 518
  - Density: 28.1/km^{2} (72.7/sq mi)
- Demonym: Pescolani
- Time zone: UTC+1 (CET)
  - Summer (DST): UTC+2 (CEST)
- Postal code: 65020
- Dialing code: 085
- ISTAT code: 068029

Pescosansonesco (Abruzzese: Lu Pièsc'hie; Pescolano: Gliu Pièšc'he) is a comune and town in the province of Pescara in the Abruzzo region of Italy. It is 500 metres (1,600 ft) above sea level in the natural park known as the "Gran Sasso e Monti della Laga National Park". Famous for its sanctuary, the village is divided into two parts: the old suburb, "Pescosansonesco Vecchio", which was abandoned in 1944 due to numerous landslides caused by a series of earthquakes, and the new village, "Pescosansonesco Nuovo", built some 3 km (2 mi) away, in the “Ambrosian” region. Before the establishment of Pescosansonesco in the 10th century, there was an ancient settlement, called a pagus. The pre-Roman inhabitants of the area created a sanctuary at Lake Morrone in the 5th century BC.
