= Civitaquana =

- Comune
- Comune di Civitaquana
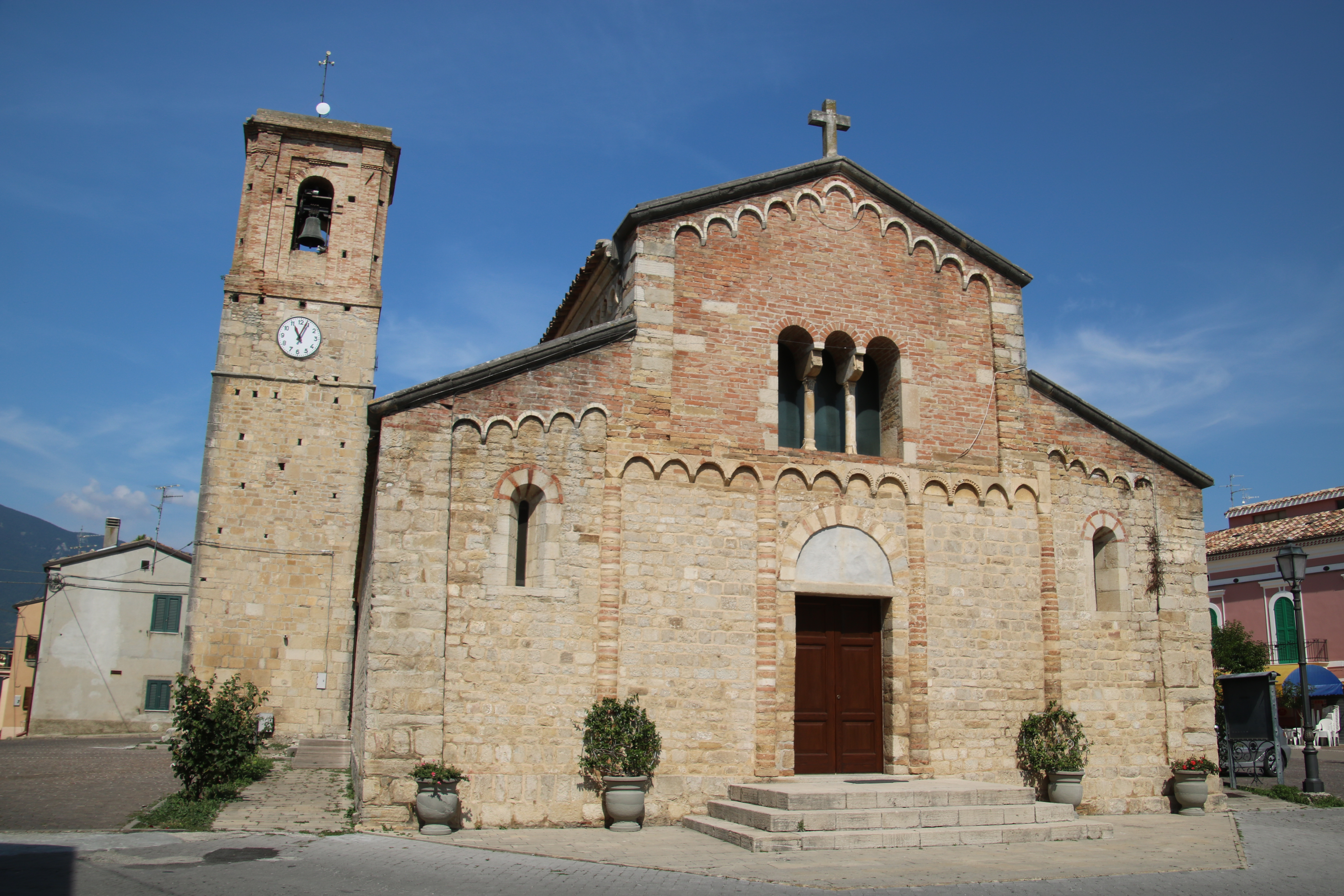
- Church of Santa Maria delle Grazie, Civitaquana

- Location within Italy Location within Abruzzo
- Coordinates: 42°19′N 13°54′E
- Country: Italy
- Region: Abruzzo
- Province: Pescara (PE)
- Frazioni: Brittoli, Catignano, Civitella Casanova, Cugnoli, Loreto Aprutino, Pietranico, Vicoli

Government
  - Mayor: Samuele Di Profio (since 2020) (Civitaquana Riparte)

Area
  - Total: 21 km^{2} (8.1 sq mi)
- Elevation: 550 m (1,800 ft)

Population (2024)
  - Total: 1,109
  - Density: 53/km^{2} (140/sq mi)
- Time zone: UTC+1 (CET)
  - Summer (DST): UTC+2 (CEST)
- Postal code: 65010
- Dialing code: 085

Civitaquana (Abruzzese: Cetacquàne) is a comune and town in the Province of Pescara in the Abruzzo region of Italy

== History ==
In 883, the town is mentioned in the Chronicon Casauriense as part of the diocesis of Penne. In 1269, Civitaquana was granted as a fiefdom by King Charles of Anjou to poet Sordello da Goito, but he probably died immediately afterwards since the king gave Civitaquana to Bonifacio di Galiberto. In 1458, king Ferrante d'Aragona granted the lordship to Laudadio De Lagmyniano, "Giustiziere" of Abruzzo, whose palace can still be seen in the main square.
