= Colle della Morte =

Coordinates: 42°32′38″N 13°58′06″E

- Frazione
- Interactive map of Colle della Morte
- Country: Italy
- Region: Abruzzo
- Province: Teramo
- Time zone: UTC+1 (CET)
  - Summer (DST): UTC+2 (CEST)

Colle della Morte is a frazione in the Province of Teramo in the Abruzzo region of Italy.
