= List of people from Maine =

State flag of Maine

Location of Maine in the United States

The following is a list of prominent people who were born in the American state of Maine, live in Maine, or for whom Maine is a significant part of their identity.

== A ==
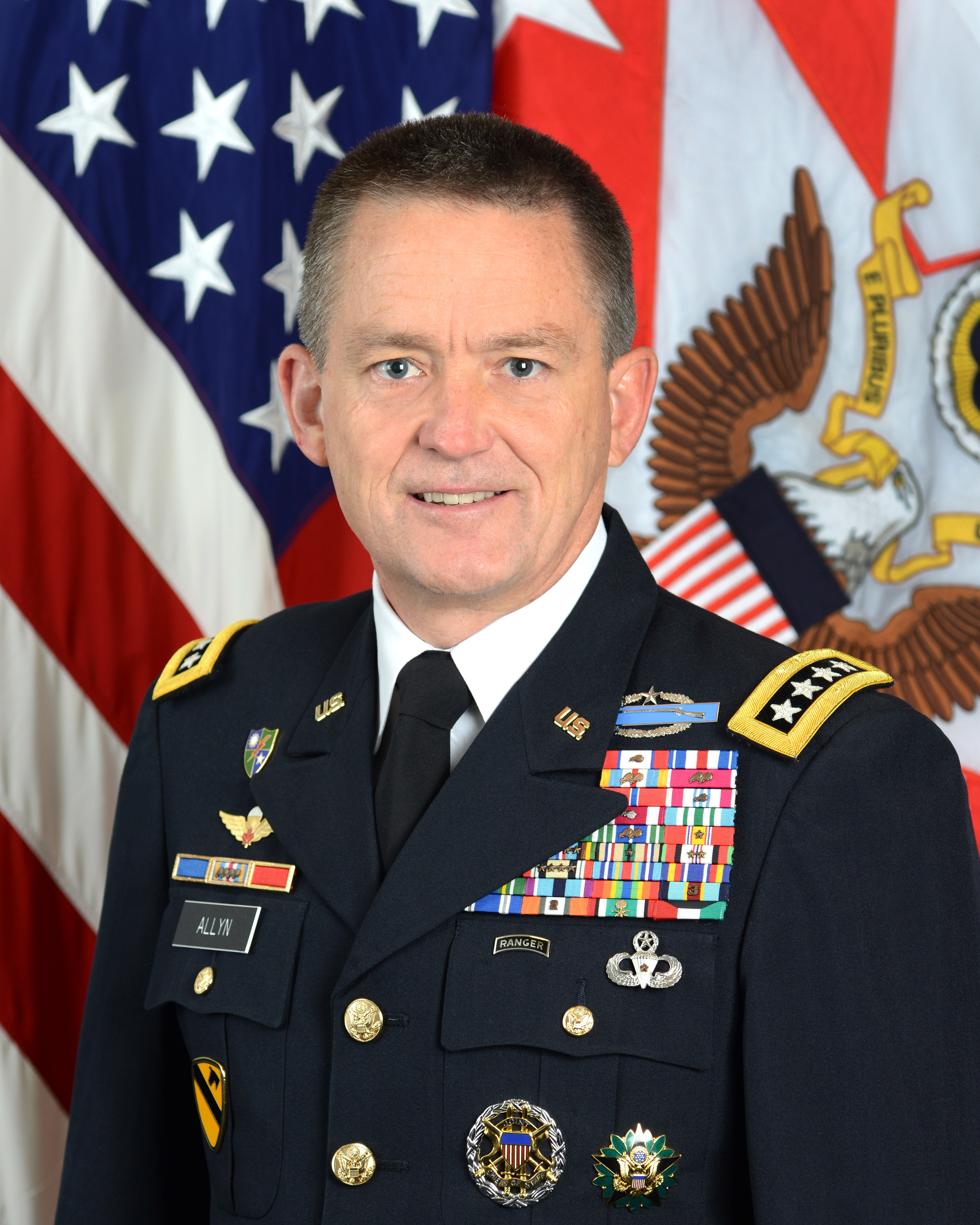
Daniel B. Allyn

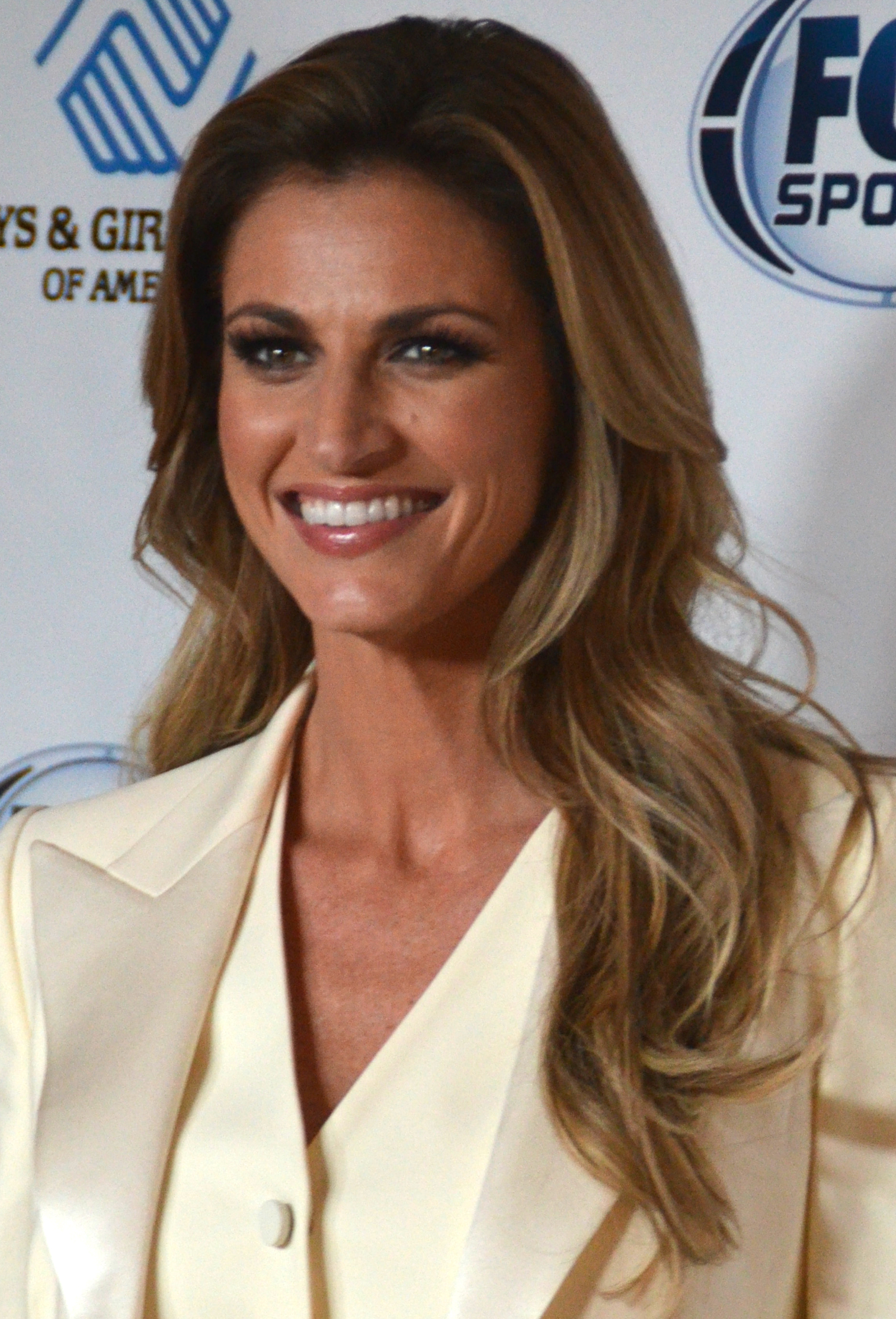
Erin Andrews

- Angela Adams (born 1965), designer; born in North Haven
- Paul André Albert (1926–2019), scientist; born in Van Buren
- Harold Alfond (1914–2007), businessman; founded the Dexter Shoe Company
- Tom Allen (born 1945), politician, congressman (1997–2009); born in Portland
- Daniel B. Allyn (born 1959), vice chief of staff of the United States Army, 2014–2017
- Adelbert Ames (1835–1933), military officer, politician, governor of Mississippi (1868–1870; 1874–1876), United States senator from Mississippi (1870–1874); born in Rockland
- Benjamin Ames (1778–1835), politician, governor of Maine (1821–1822); lived in Houlton
- Erin Andrews (born 1978), sportscaster, Dancing With the Stars contestant and co-host; born in Lewiston

== B ==
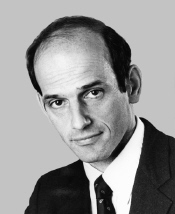
John Baldacci

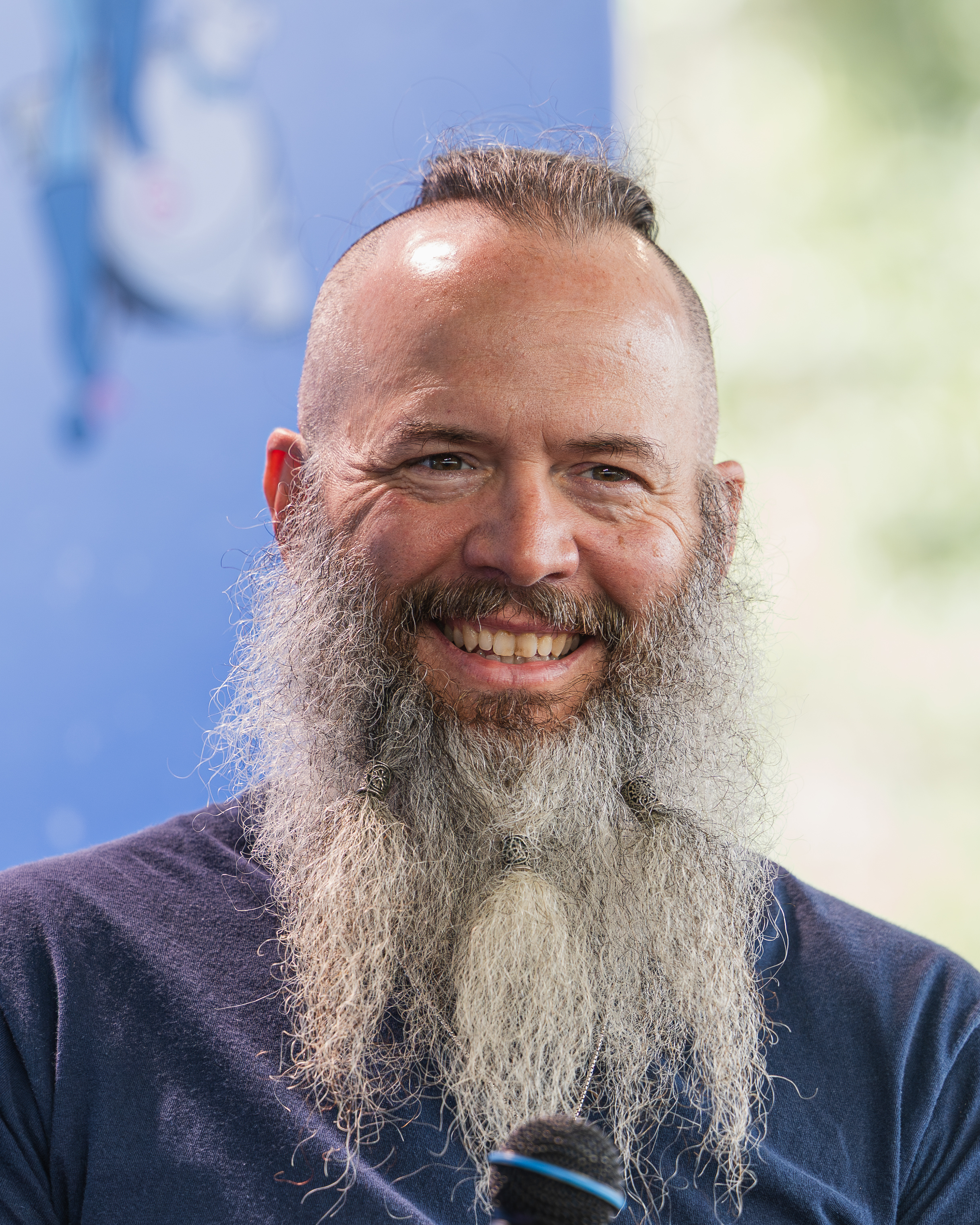
Christopher Daniel Barnes

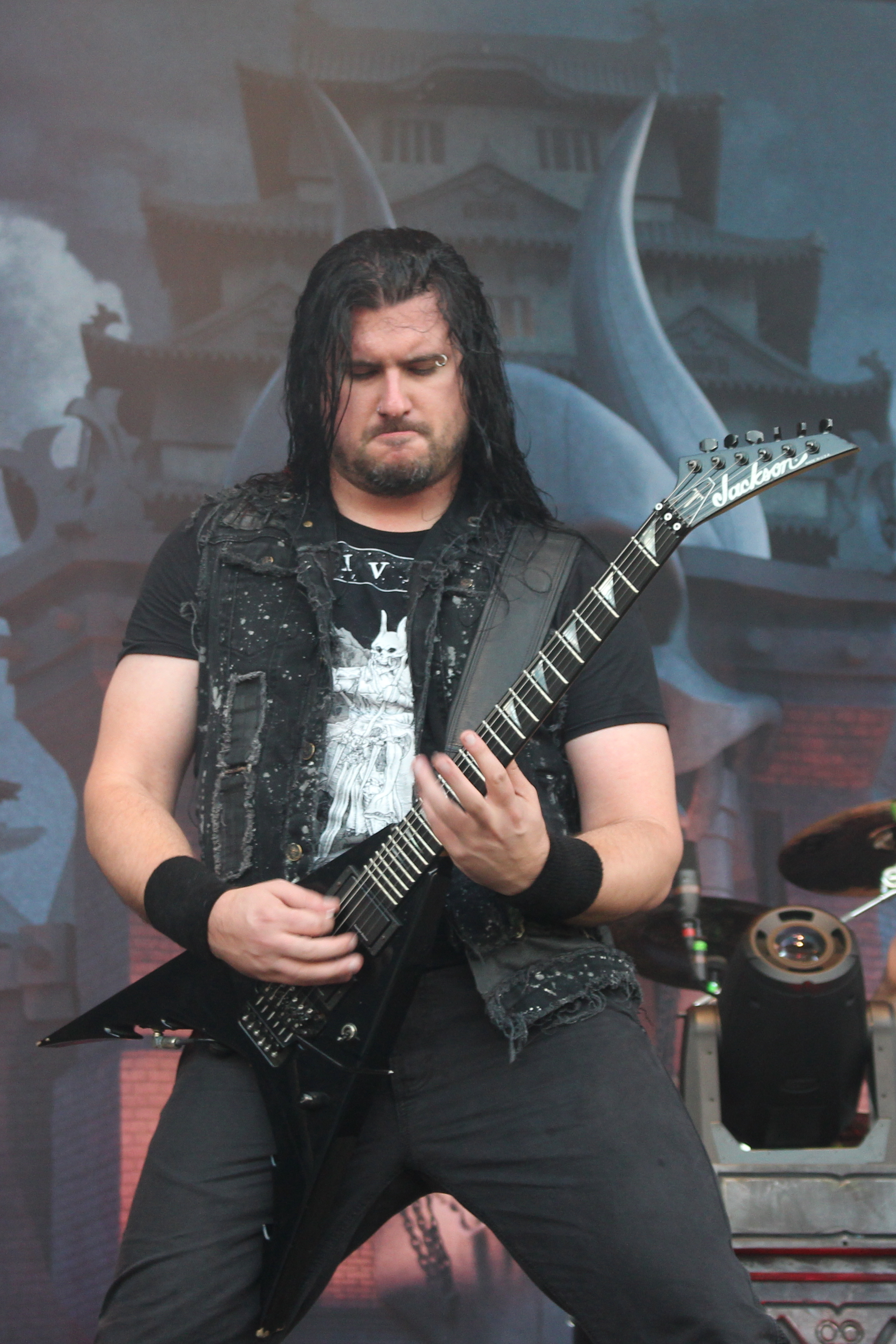
Corey Beaulieu

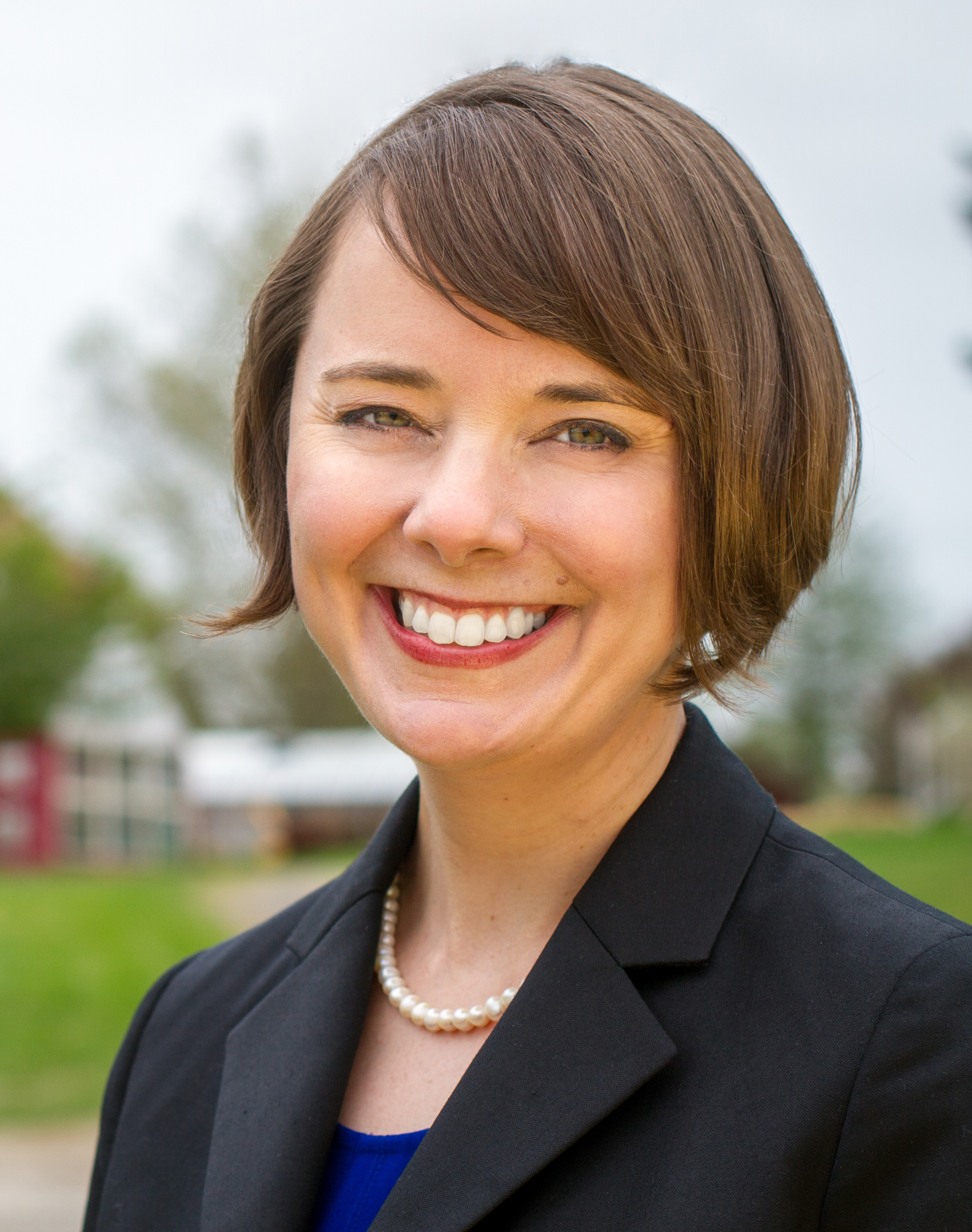
Shenna Bellows

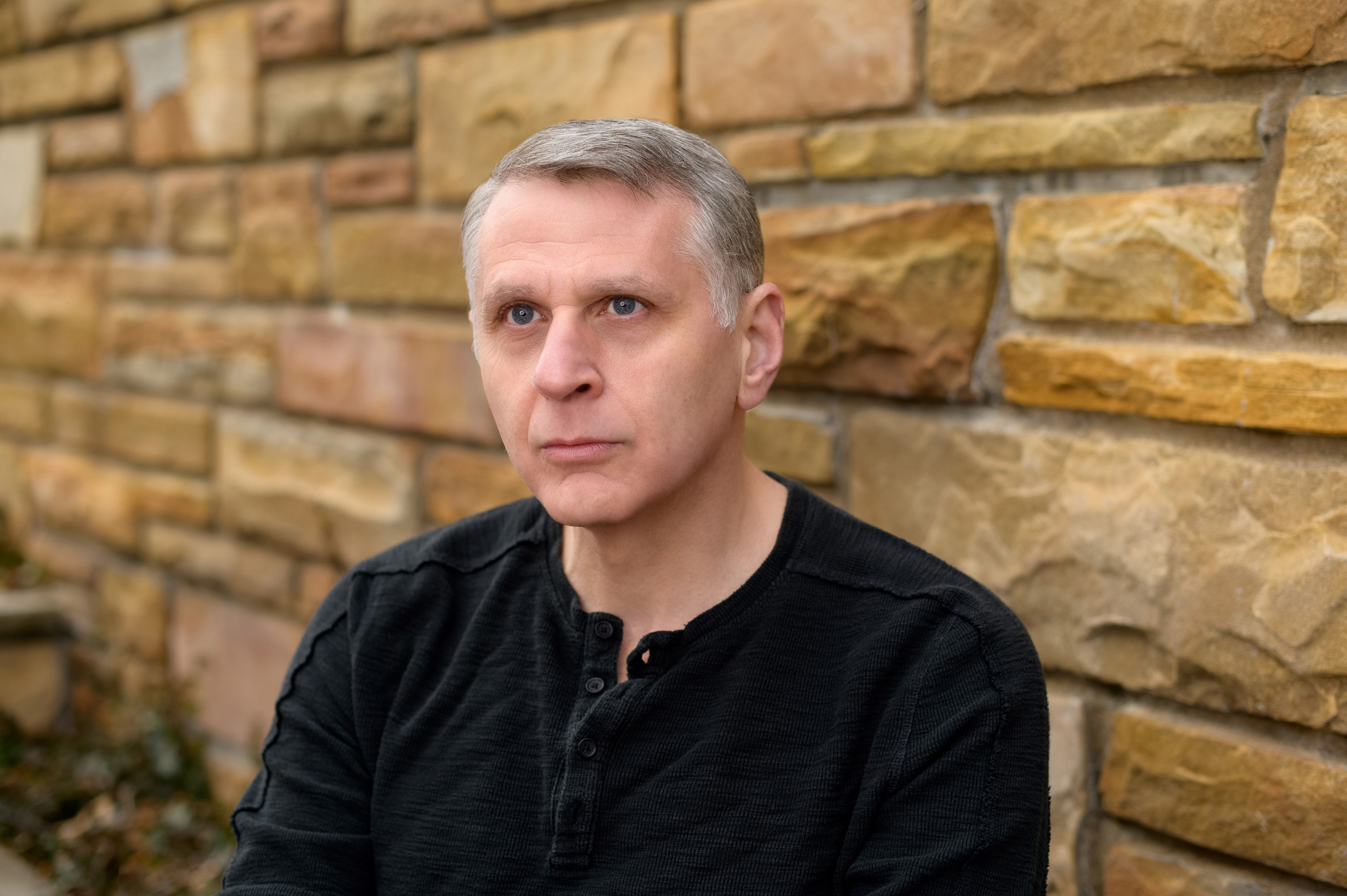
Jacques Berlinerblau

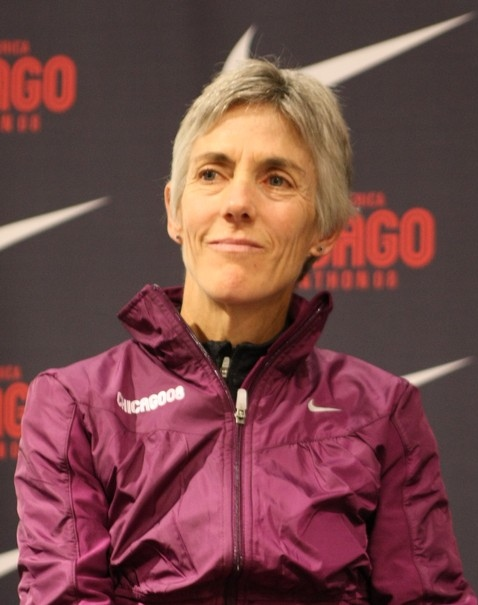
Joan Benoit

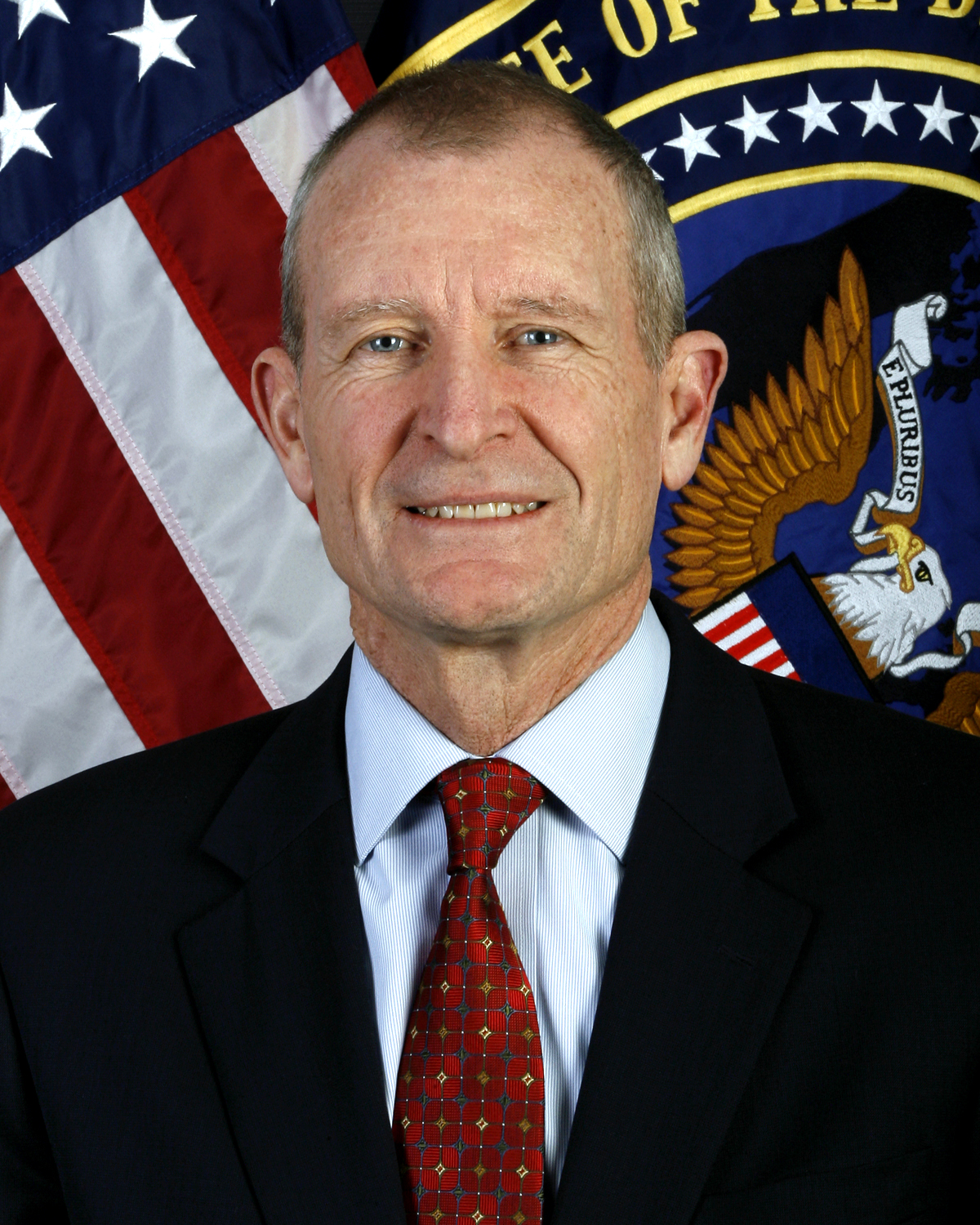
Dennis Blair

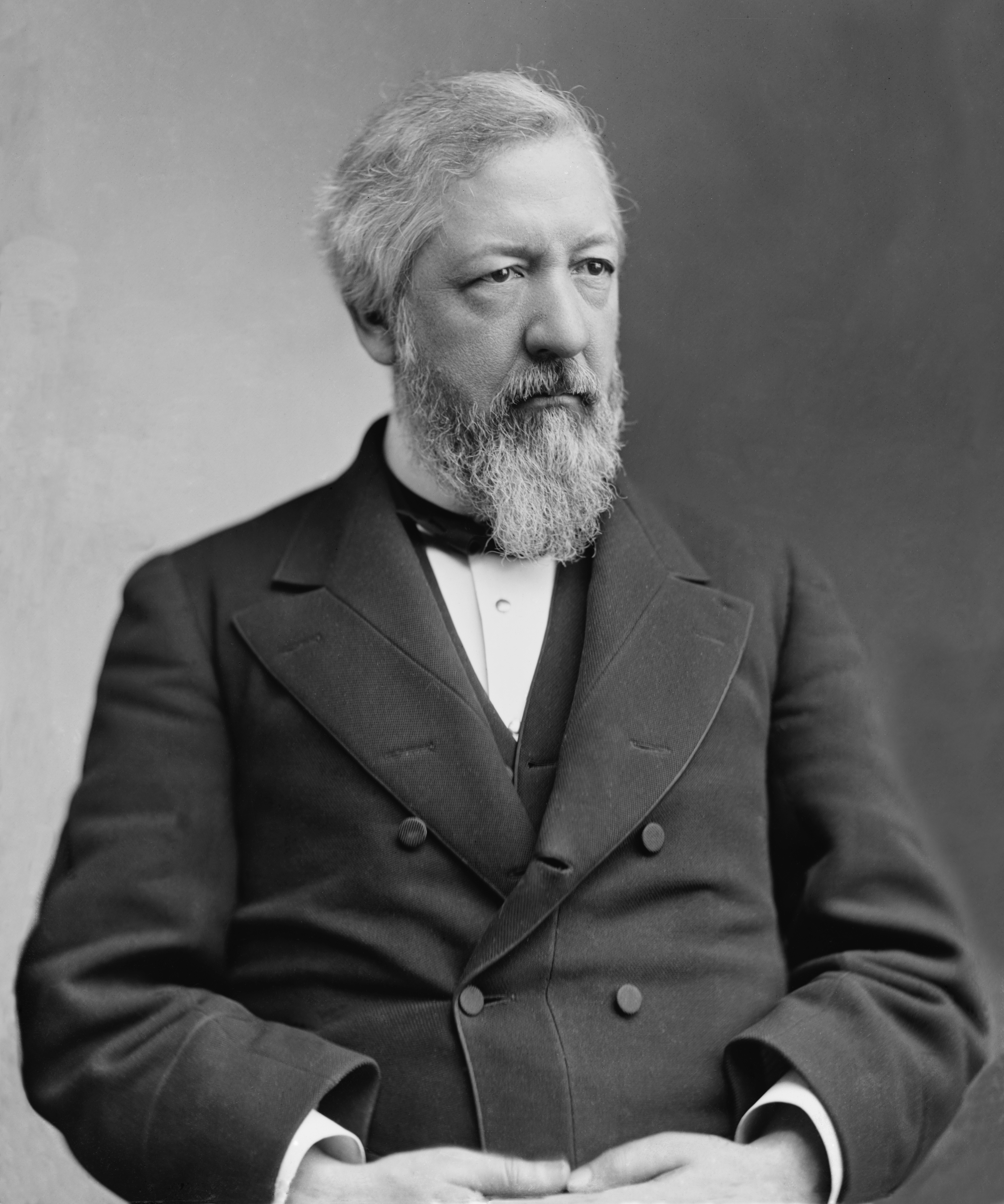
James G. Blaine

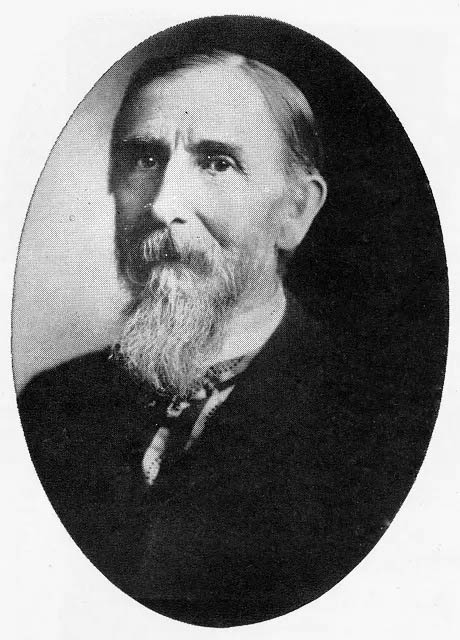
Milton Bradley

- John Baldacci (born 1955), politician, governor of Maine (2003–2011), congressman (1995–2003); born in Bangor, lives in Portland
- Charles P. Barnes (1869–1951), 17th chief justice of the Maine Supreme Judicial Court and 67th speaker of the Maine House of Representatives; born and died in Houlton
- Christopher Daniel Barnes (born 1972), actor, voice actor, The Little Mermaid film, Spider-Man television series; born in Portland
- Trevor Bates (born 1993), former professional football player; born in Portland
- Marie Battiste (born 1949), indigenous scholar; born in Houlton
- Leon Leonwood Bean (1872–1967), founder of L.L. Bean Inc., a large private retail company in Freeport
- Linda Bean (1941–2024), businessperson and political candidate, granddaughter of Leon Leonwood Bean; lived in Freeport
- Corey Beaulieu (born 1983), musician, guitarist in Trivium; born in Brunswick
- Anna Belknap (born 1974), actress, Lindsay Monroe on CSI: NY; born in Damariscotta
- Shenna Bellows (born 1975), politician, secretary of state of Maine; lives in Manchester
- Rick Bennett (born 1963), politician, former president of the Maine Senate; lives in Norway
- Joan Benoit (born 1957), first women's Olympic marathon champion; born in Cape Elizabeth
- Louisa Dow Benton (1831–1895), linguist, translator; born in Portland
- Jacques Berlinerblau (born 1966), religious scholar, Georgetown University professor; born in Portland
- Carroll Thayer Berry (1886–1978), printmaker, woodcut engraver, painter and photographer; born in New Gloucester
- Albert S. Bickmore (1839–1914), naturalist, originator and principal founder of the American Museum of Natural History; born in St. George
- Del Bissonette (1899–1972), professional Major League Baseball player and coach; born in Winthrop
- Nina Blackwood (born 1955), radio and television personality, actor, model; lives in Mid Coast region
- James G. Blaine (1830–1893), United States representative from Maine, senator from Maine, and secretary of state, Republican presidential candidate in 1884; lived in Augusta
- Dennis Blair (born 1947), US director of National Intelligence (2009–2010), four-star U.S. Navy admiral; born in Kittery
- Cindy Blodgett (born 1975), former professional basketball player and coach; born in Clinton
- Tim Boetsch (born 1981), mixed martial artist; born in Lincolnville
- Gordon Bok (born 1939), folk singer-songwriter; born in Camden
- Dan Bolduc (born 1953), former professional NHL hockey player; born in Waterville
- Ralph Botting (born 1955), pitcher for the California Angels; born in Houlton
- William B. Bradbury (1816–1868), musician, teacher, composer, piano manufacturer, entrepreneur; born in York
- Milton Bradley (1836–1911), board game manufacturer with the Milton Bradley Company; born in Vienna
- Joseph E. Brennan (1934–2024), politician, governor of Maine (1979–1987), congressman (1987–1991); born in Portland
- Contessa Brewer (born 1974), news anchor for MSNBC; born in Parsonsfield
- Styles Bridges (1898–1961), politician, governor of New Hampshire (1935–1937) and U.S. senator from New Hampshire (1937–1961); born in Pembroke
- James Brooks (1807–1873), congressman from New York; born in Portland
- Brett Brown (born 1961), professional NBA basketball coach and executive; born in South Portland
- Harry Brown (1917–1986), poet, novelist, screenwriter; born in Portland
- Scott Brown (born 1959), U.S. senator from Massachusetts (2010–13); born in Kittery
- Ashley Bryan (1923–2022), writer and illustrator; resided in Islesford
- Chet Bulger (1917–2009), professional NFL football player; born in Rumford
- John Bunting (born 1950), former professional NFL football player; born in Portland
- John Jay Butler (1814–1891), minister and professor; born in Berwick
- Marisa Butler (born 1994), model, singer and beauty pageant title holder; Miss Maine USA 2016, Miss World America 2018, and Miss Earth USA 2021
- Brian Butterfield (born 1958), professional Major League Baseball coach; born in Bangor

== C ==
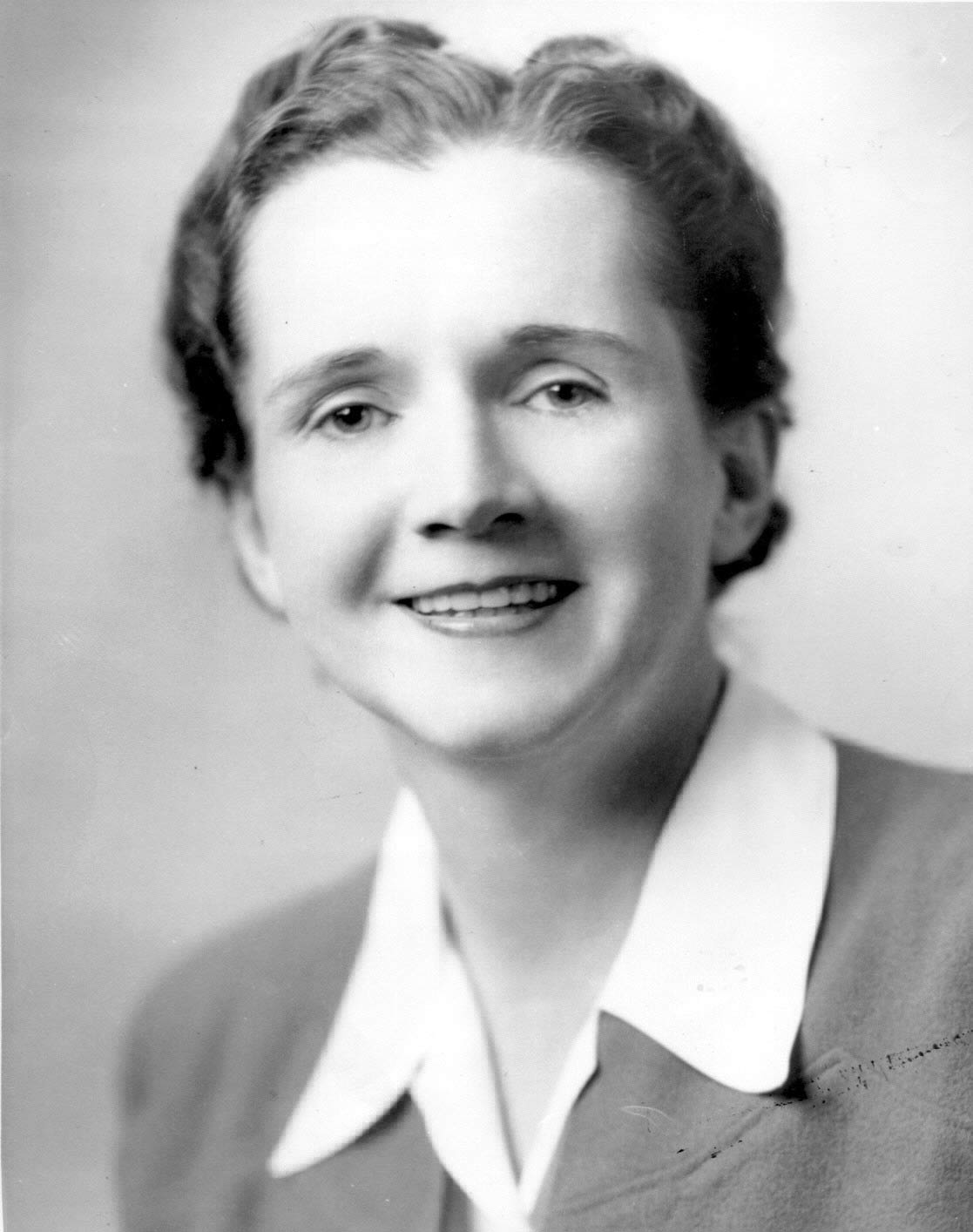
Rachel Carson

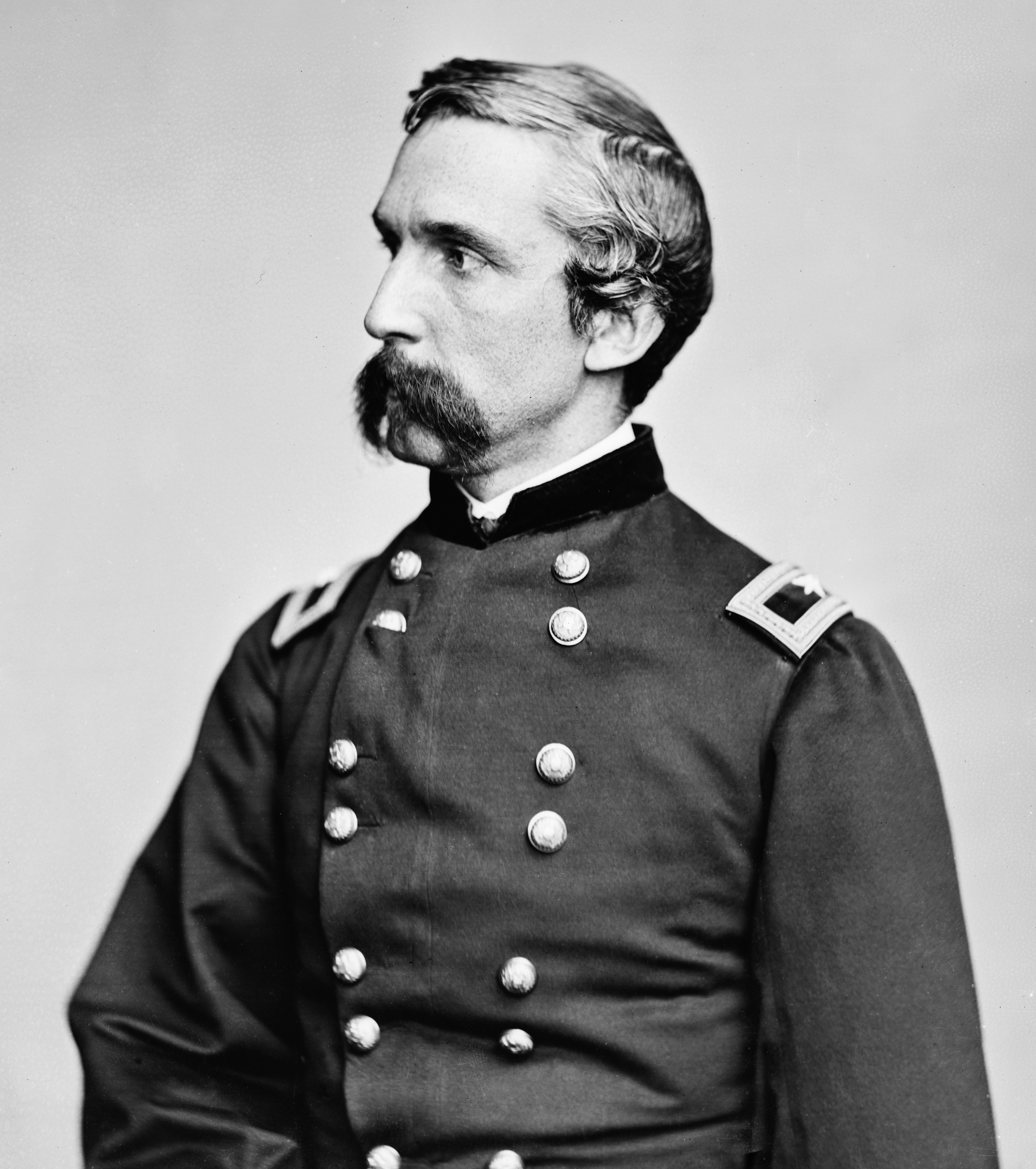
Joshua L. Chamberlain

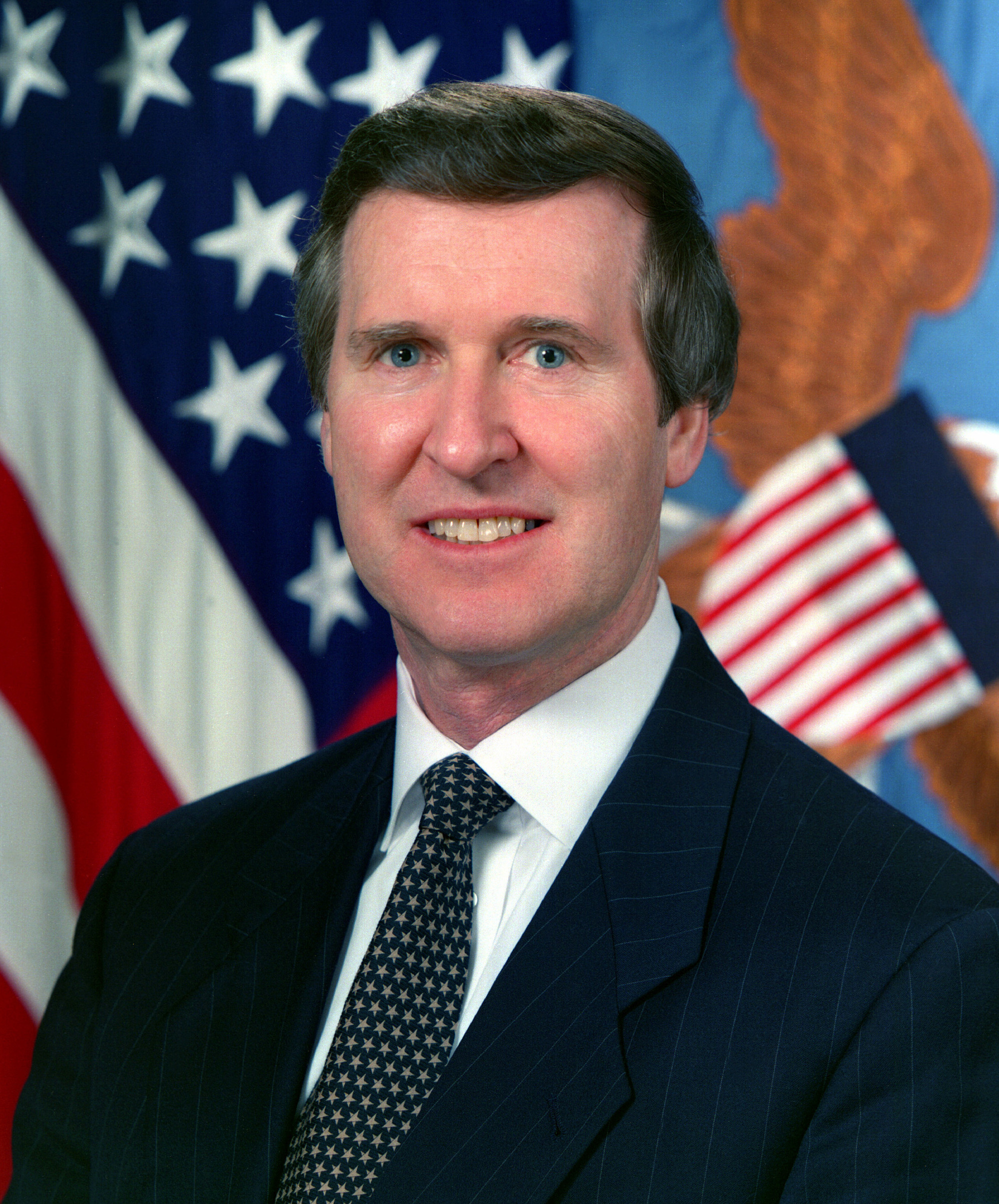
William Cohen

- Nik Caner-Medley (born 1983), former professional basketball player; raised in Portland
- Al Carbee (1914–2005), outsider artist; born in Portland, lived in Saco
- Robert Card, US Army reserve sergeant first class (E-7) and mass murderer
- John Cariani (born 1969), actor, Law & Order; grew up in Presque Isle
- Tom Caron (born 1963), sportscaster and soccer executive; born in Lewiston
- Howie Carr (born 1952), journalist, author, radio talk-show host; born in Portland
- Michael E. Carpenter (born 1947), Maine attorney general and state legislator; born in Houlton
- Bill Carrigan (1883–1969), professional baseball player and manager; born in Lewiston
- Rachel Carson (1907–1964), author; lived in Southport
- Shepard Cary (1805–1866) US congressman; died in Houlton
- Walter Case Jr., harness racer
- Elisabeth Cavazza (1849–1926), author, journalist; born in Portland
- Joshua Chamberlain (1828–1914), Civil War major general, governor of Maine (1867–1871)
- Thomas Davee Chamberlain (1841–1896), Civil War lieutenant colonel, brother of Major General Joshua Chamberlain
- Conrad Chase (1965–2024), actor, singer; born in Portland
- Oren Burbank Cheney (1816–1903), student, teacher, principal Parsonsfield Seminary; Free Will Baptist clergyman; abolitionist; founding president of Bates College
- Yvon Chouinard (born 1938), founder of Black Diamond Equipment and Patagonia; born in Lewiston
- Cody Christian (born 1995), actor; Pretty Little Liars, Teen Wolf; born in Portland and grew up on a Penobscot reservation
- Frank Churchill (1901–1942), Oscar-winning composer for many Disney animated films; born in Rumford
- Carolyn Chute (born 1947), novelist, populist political activist; born in Portland; lives in Parsonsfield
- Nathan Clifford (1803–1881), associate justice of the United States Supreme Court, attorney general of the United States; lived in Newfield
- Eunice Hale Cobb (1803–1880), writer, activist; born in Kennebunk
- Frank M. Coffin (1919 –2009), politician and federal judge
- William Cohen (born 1940), U.S. congressman (1973–1979), senator (1979–1997), US secretary of defense (1997–2001); born in and mayor of Bangor (1971–1973)
- Susan Collins (born 1952), U.S. senator from Maine; born in Caribou
- Samuel Colman (1832–1920), artist, writer, interior designer; born in Portland
- Jennie Maria Drinkwater Conklin (1841–1900), author, activist; born in Portland
- Ernie Coombs (1927–2001), children's entertainer, known for Mr. Dressup; born in Lewiston
- Michelle Coombs, geologist currently working in Alaska, originally from Maine
- Thurlow Cooper (1933–2008), professional football player; born in Augusta
- William Coperthwaite (1930–2013), educator and yurt advocate; born in Monticello
- Ron Corning (born 1971), TV host at WFAA in Dallas, Texas; raised in Calais
- Mike "Fluff" Cowan (born 1947), PGA Tour golf caddy; born in Winslow
- Ricky Craven (born 1966), ESPN broadcaster, NASCAR driver; born in Newburgh
- Laura Creavalle (born 1959), Guyanese-born Canadian/American professional bodybuilder; lives in Old Orchard Beach
- Ian Crocker (born 1982), three-time Olympic champion in swimming; born in Portland
- Effie Crockett (1856–1940), actress, wrote and composed the lullaby "Rock-a-bye Baby"; born in Rockland
- John Crowley (born 1942), author of fantasy, science fiction and mainstream fiction; born in Presque Isle
- Earl Cunningham (1893–1977), folk artist; born in Edgecomb
- Dick Curless (1932–1995), country singer; born in Fort Fairfield
- Ron Currie Jr. (born 1975), author; lives in Portland

== D ==
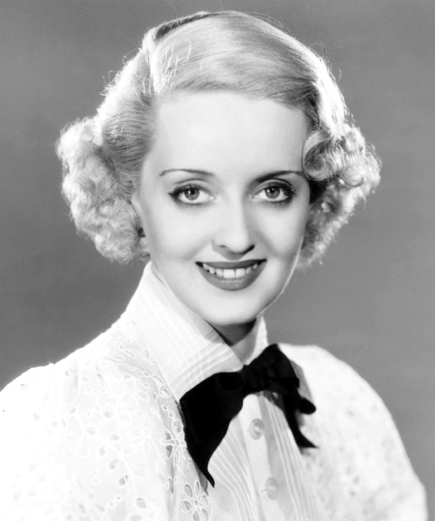
Bette Davis

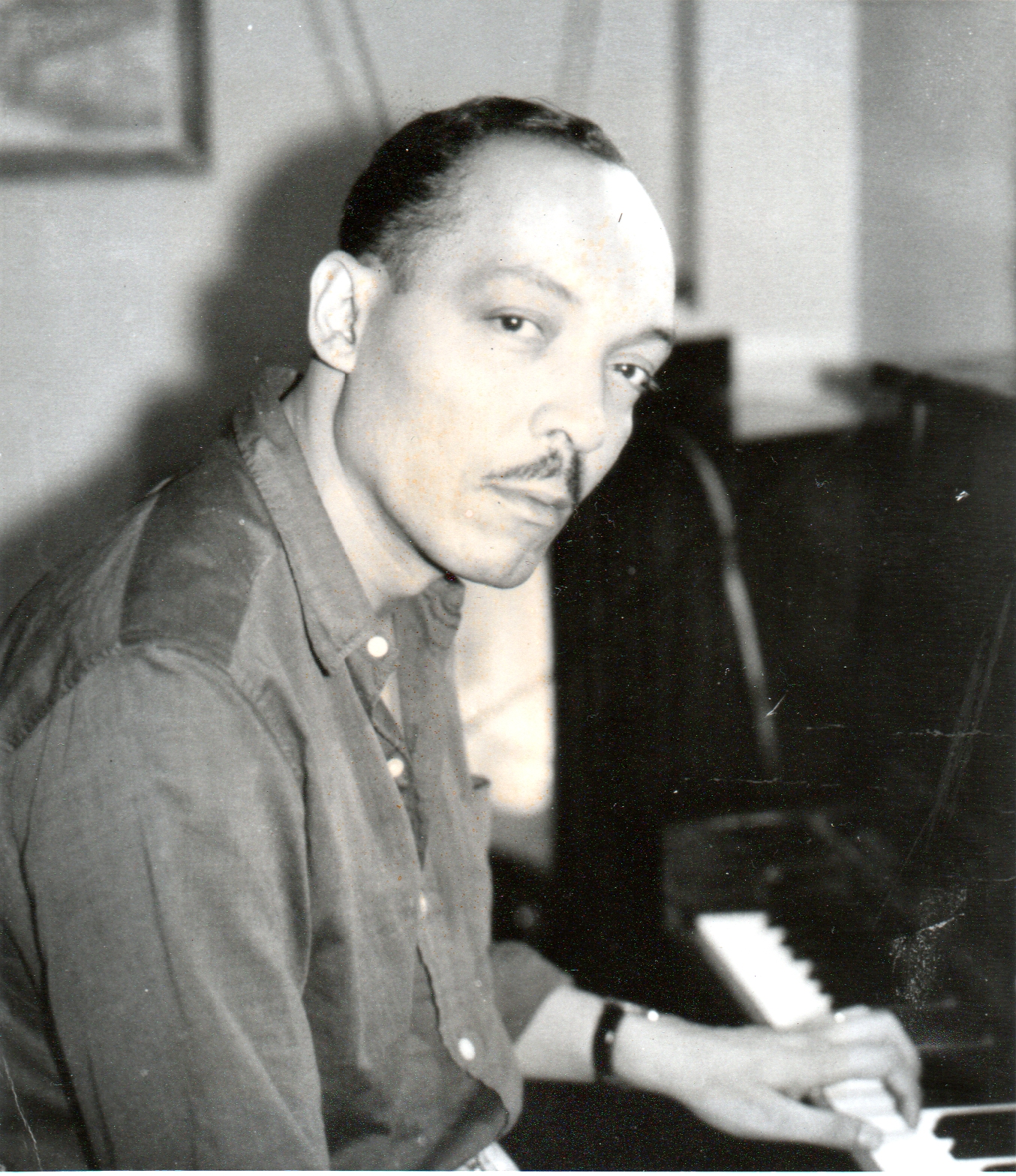
Claude Demetrius

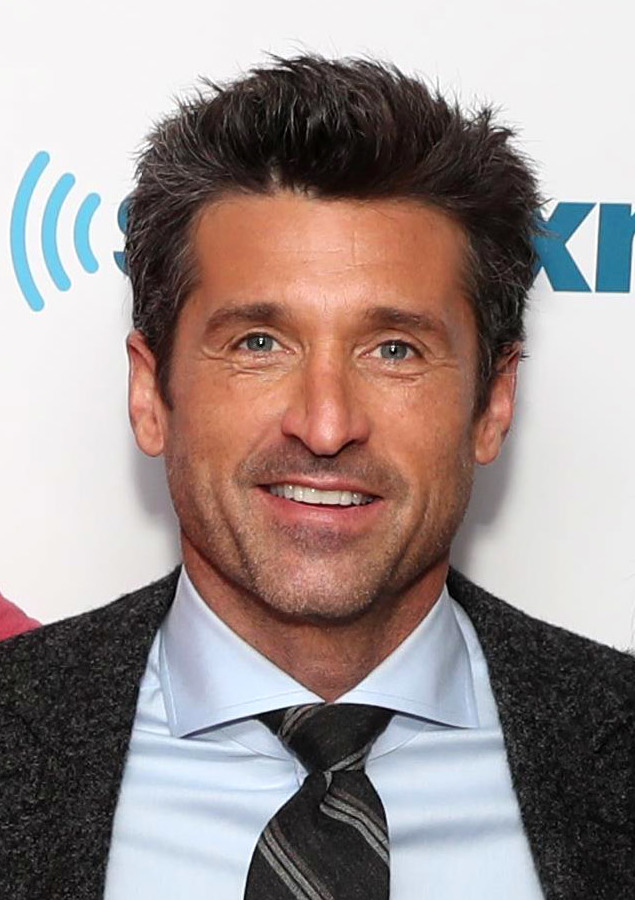
Patrick Dempsey

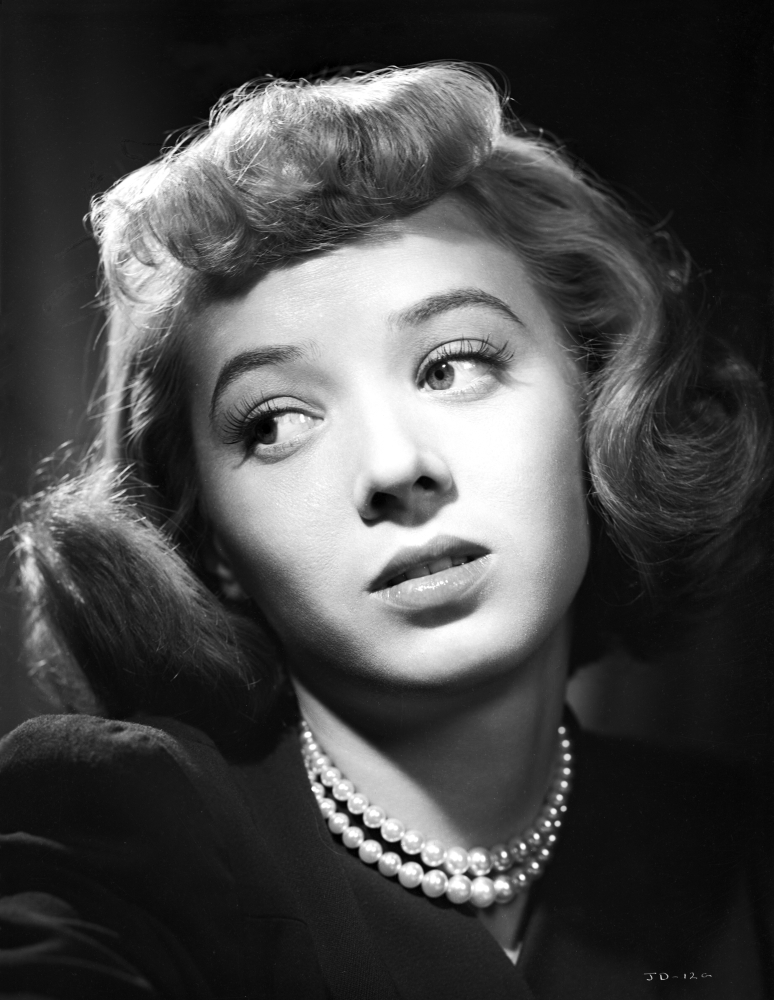
Jeff Donnell

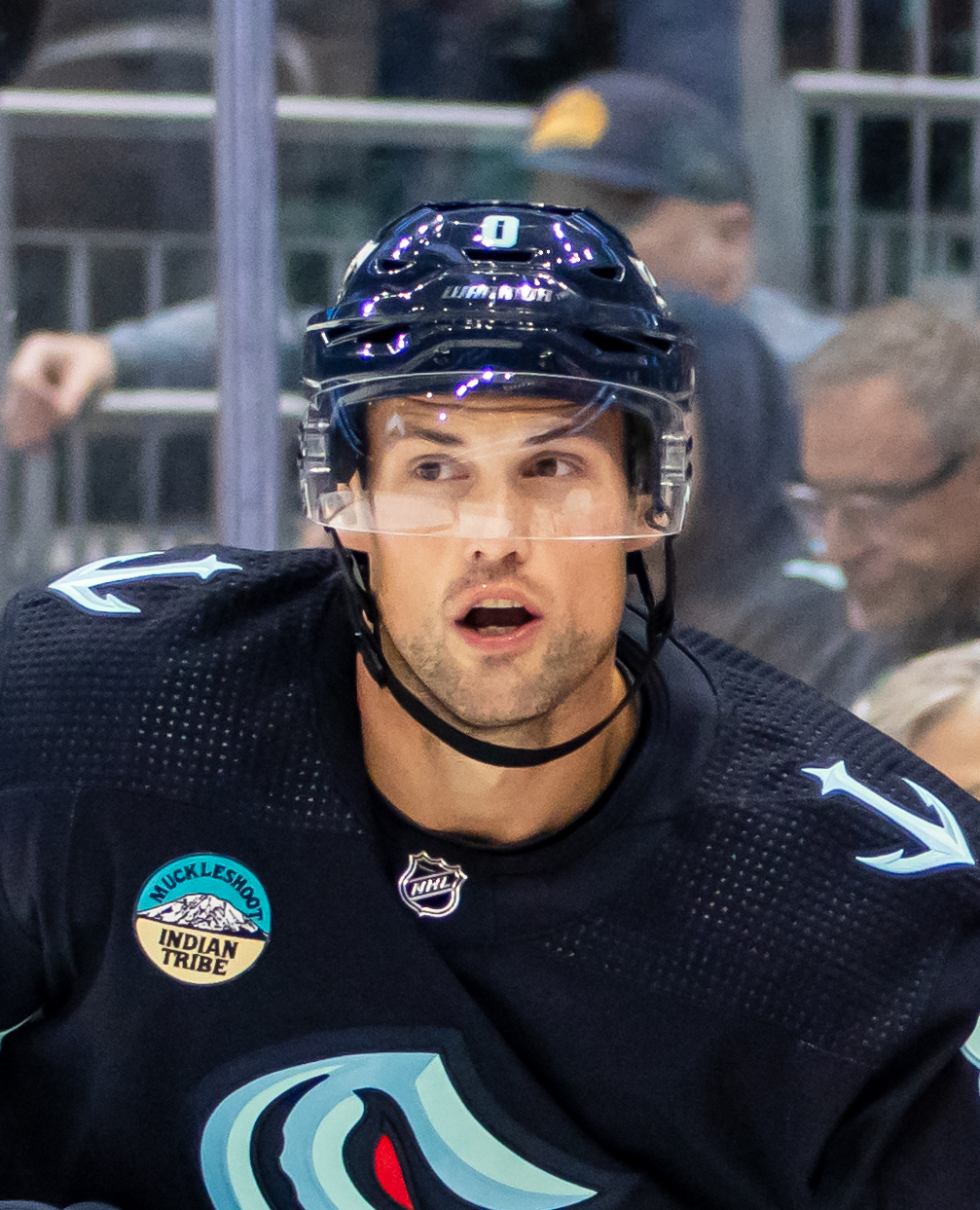
Brian Dumoulin

- Robert L. Dale (1924–2020), pilot in Antarctica and namesake of the Dale Glacier; lived in Brunswick
- Sarah D'Alelio (born 1980), professional mixed martial artist; born in Belfast
- Frances Brackett Damon (1857–1939), poet, writer; born in Dexter
- Olive E. Dana (1859–1904), writer, poet; born in Augusta
- Bette Davis (1908–1989), two-time Oscar-winning actress; born in Massachusetts and lived in Cape Elizabeth
- Marcus Davis (born 1963), mixed martial arts fighter with the Ultimate Fighting Championship; born in Houlton
- Nate Davis (born 1996), professional football player; born in York
- Owen Davis (1874–1956), Pulitzer Prize-winning dramatist; born in Portland
- Howie Day (born 1981), singer; born and raised in Brewer
- Everett De Roche (1946–2014), screenwriter; born in Lincoln
- William Deering (1826–1913), businessman and philanthropist, co-founder of International Harvester; born in South Paris
- Grace DeGennaro (born 1956), artist; resides in Yarmouth
- Claude Demetrius (1916–1988), songwriter; born in Bath
- Patrick Dempsey (born 1966), actor; born in Lewiston
- Nelson Dingley Jr. (1832–1899), governor of Maine (1874–1876), member of US House of Representatives (1881–1899), responsible for the Dingley Tariff
- Rick DiPietro (born 1981), former professional hockey player; born in Lewiston
- Dorothea Dix (1802–1878), pioneering advocate for treatment and care of the handicapped and mentally ill; born in Hampden
- George Dole (1885–1928), Olympic gold medalist in freestyle wrestling at the 1908 Summer Olympics; born in Michigan and lived in Bath
- Jeff Donnell (1921–1988), actress; born in Windham
- Alice May Douglas (1865–1943), poet, author, editor; born in Bath
- Paul Douglas (1892–1976), economist and Illinois senator (1949–1967); partly raised in Onawa
- Cornelia M. Dow (1842–1905), philanthropist, temperance activist; born and died in Portland
- William Dufris (1958–2020), original voice of Bob the Builder in North America; born in Houlton; died in South Portland
- Brian Dumoulin (born 1991), professional hockey player; born in Biddeford
- Emma B. Dunham (1826–1910), poet, teacher; born in Minot; died in Deering

== E ==
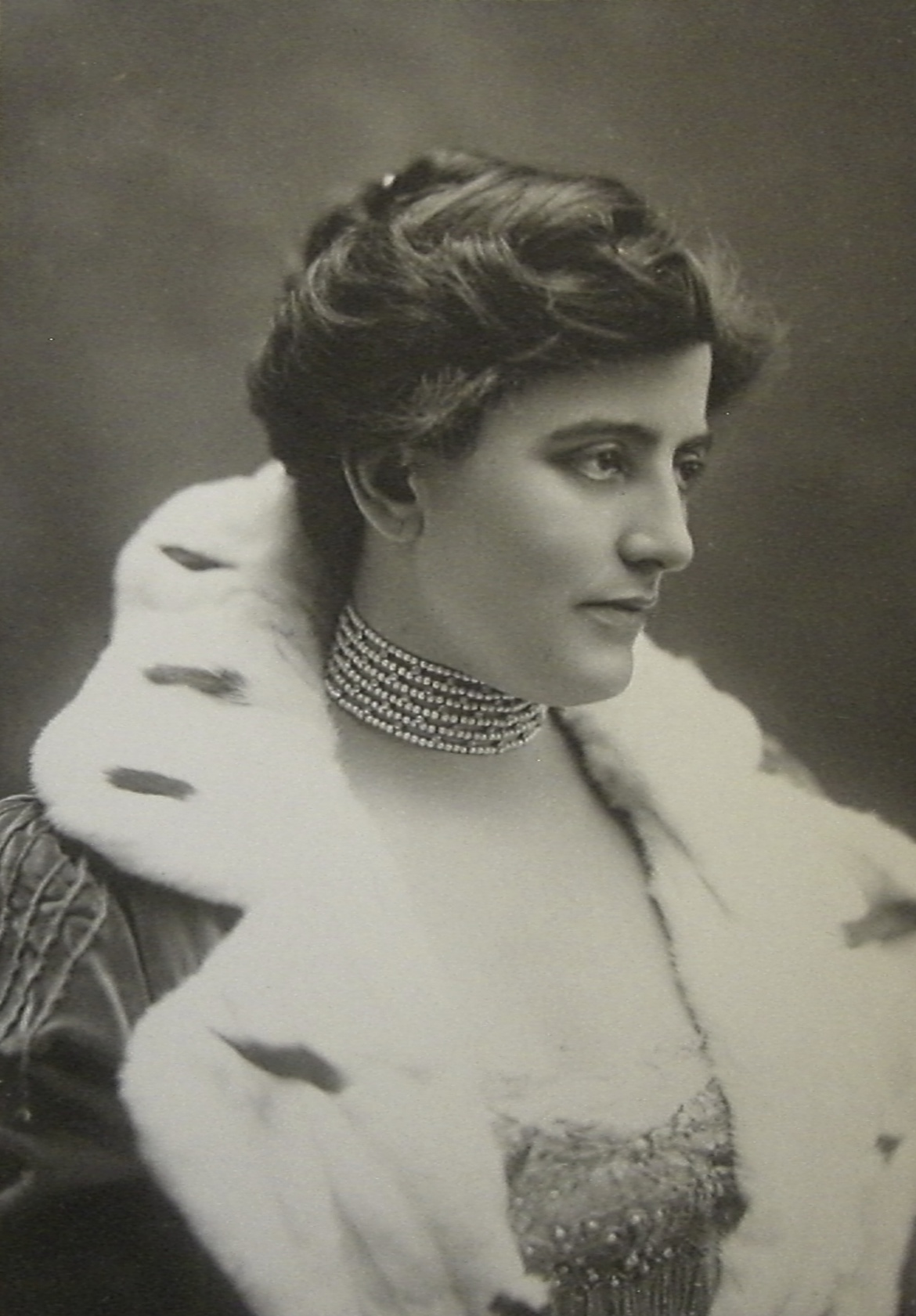
Maxine Elliott

- Kevin Eastman (born 1962), comic book artist and writer; co-created Teenage Mutant Ninja Turtles; born in Portland
- Stanley Boyd Eaton (born 1938), radiologist, one of the originators of the concept of Paleolithic nutrition; born in Old Town
- Gertrude Elliott (1874–1950), actress on stage and in silent movies; born in Rockland
- Maxine Elliott (1868–1940), stage actress; born in Rockland
- Robbie Ellis (1943–2025), professional wrestler who was featured in Sports Illustrated; born in Portland
- Ellen Russell Emerson (1837–1907), author, ethnologist; born in New Sharon
- George Barrell Emerson (1797–1881), educator; born in Kennebunk

== F ==
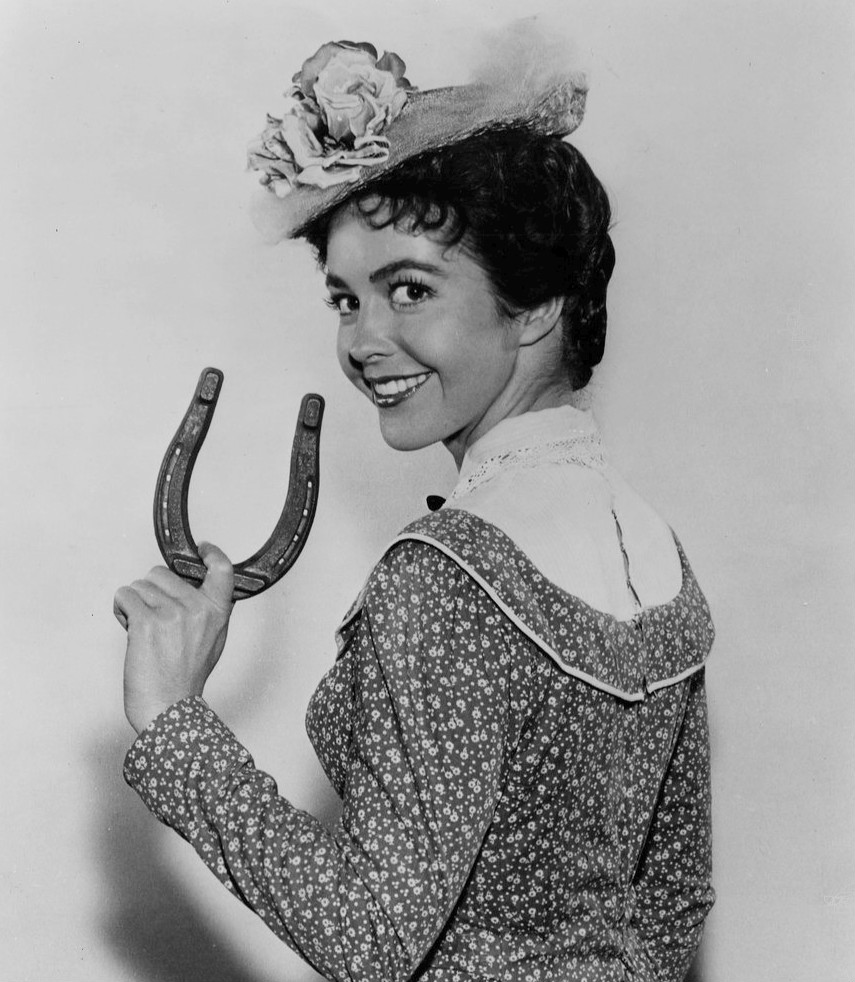
Myrna Fahey

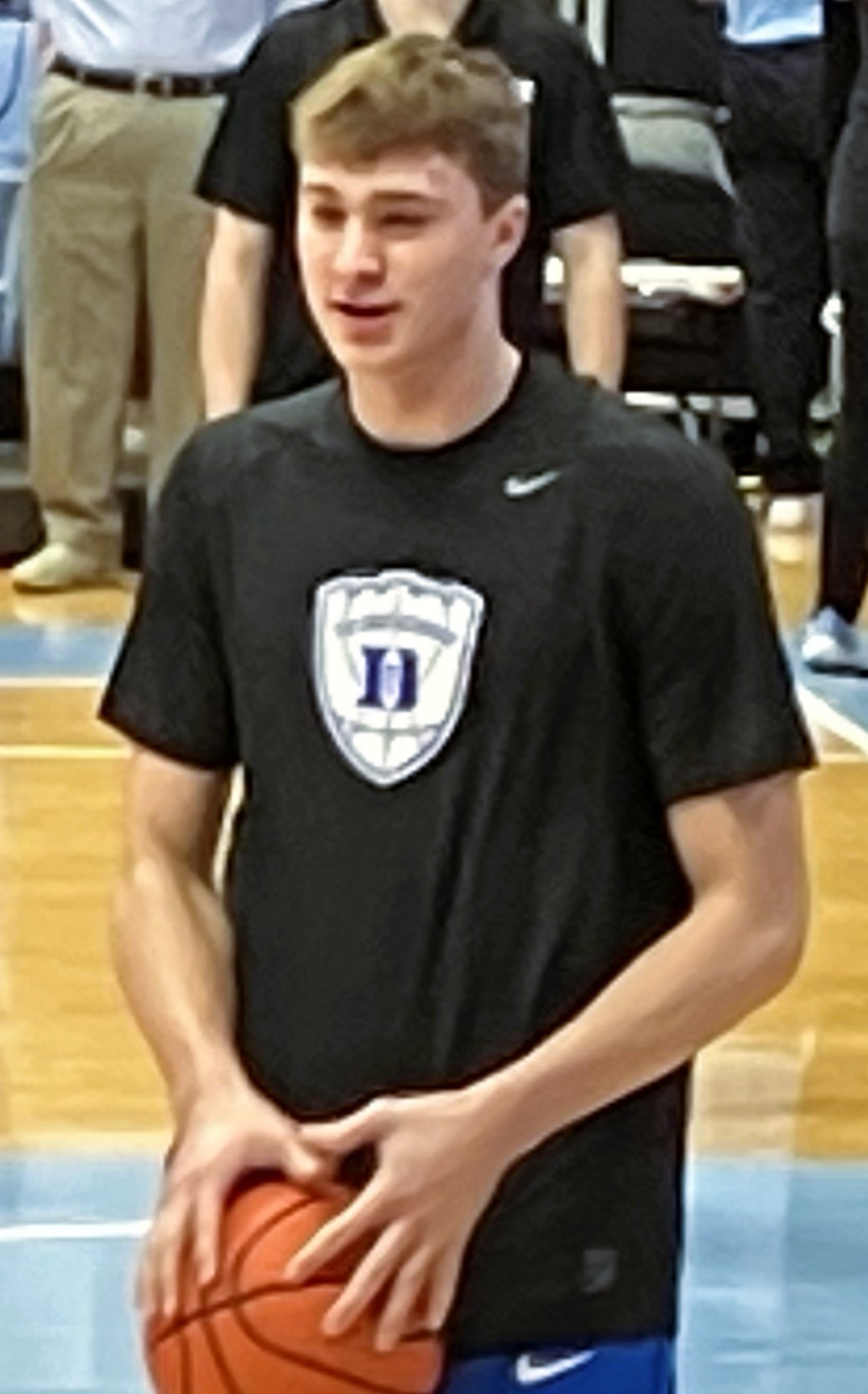
Cooper Flagg

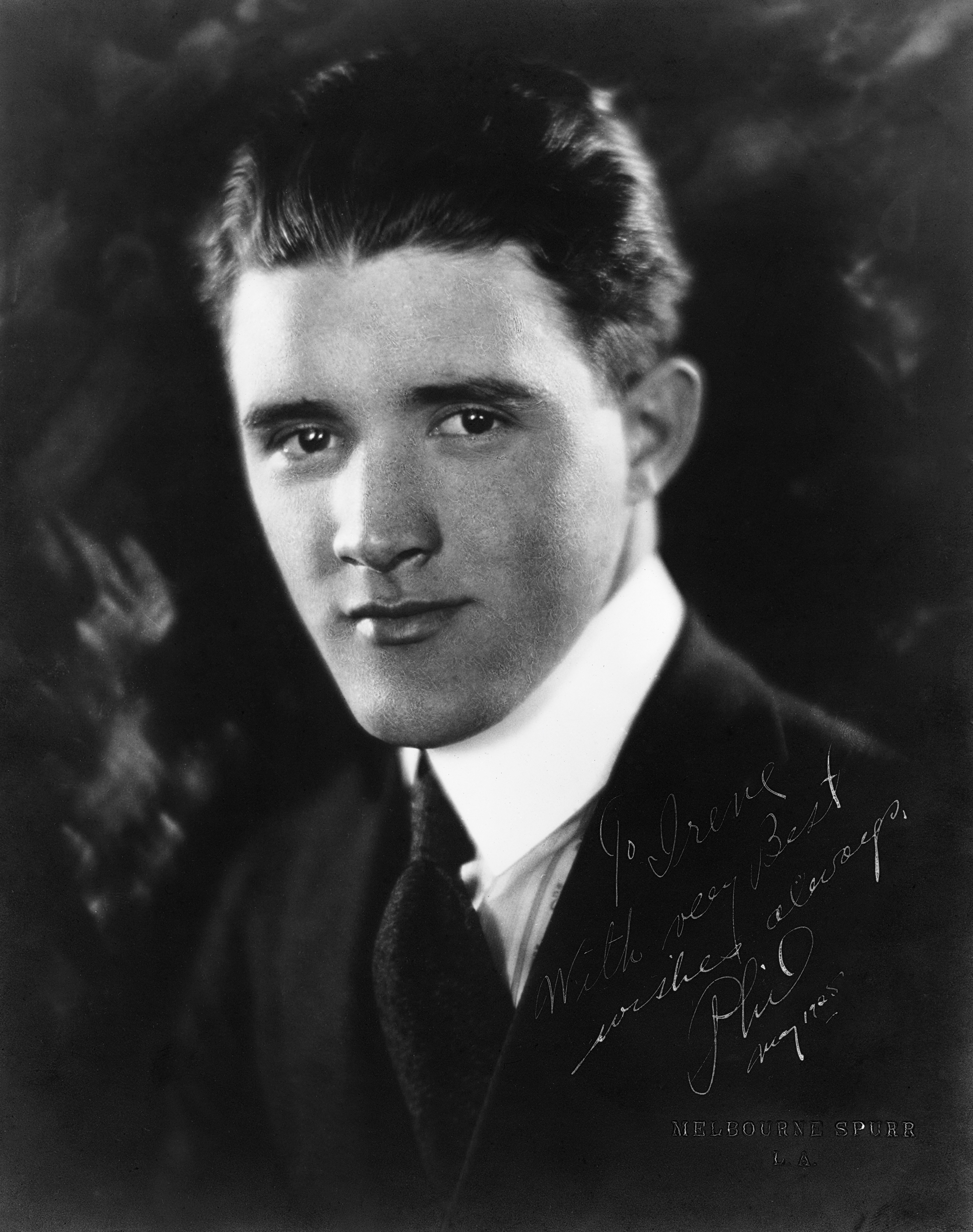
Philip Ford

- Myrna Fahey (1933–1973), actress, Father of the Bride; born in Carmel
- Hannah Tobey Farmer (1823–1891), philanthropist, writer, social reformer; born in Berwick; died in Eliot
- Terry Farnsworth (born 1942), Canadian Olympic judoka; born in Portland
- Wallace Rider Farrington (1871–1933), journalist and government administrator, territorial governor of Hawaii (1921–1929); born in Orono
- Billy Bob Faulkingham, Minority Leader of the Maine House of Representatives
- Parker Fennelly (1891–1988), actor; born in Northeast Harbor
- William Pitt Fessenden (1806–1869), politician, secretary of the treasury (1864–1865); congressman (1841–1843); senator (1854–1864; 1865–1869); lived in Portland
- Greg Finley (born 1984), actor, The Secret Life of the American Teenager; born in Portland
- Frank Fixaris (1934–2006), sportscaster; resident of Falmouth
- Cooper Flagg (born 2006), professional basketball player; born in Newport
- Ryan Flaherty (born 1986), former professional baseball player and current coach; born in Portland
- James Flavin (1906–1976), film and television actor; born in Portland
- Charles Flint (1850–1934), businessman, founder of Computing-Tabulating-Recording Company, which later became IBM; born in Thomaston
- Francis Ford (1881–1953), actor, writer, director, brother of John Ford; born in Portland
- John Ford (1894–1973), film director, winner of six Oscars; born in Cape Elizabeth, raised on Munjoy Hill in Portland
- Philip Ford (1900–1976), film director, nephew of John Ford; born in Portland
- Doug Friedman (born 1976), former professional hockey player; born in Cape Elizabeth
- Melville Fuller (1833–1910), eighth chief justice of the United States (1888–1910); born in Augusta
- Charlie Furbush (born 1986), former professional baseball player; born in Portland

== G ==
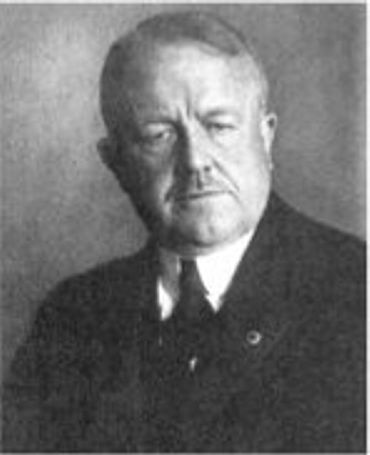
Frank Bunker Gilbreth, Sr.

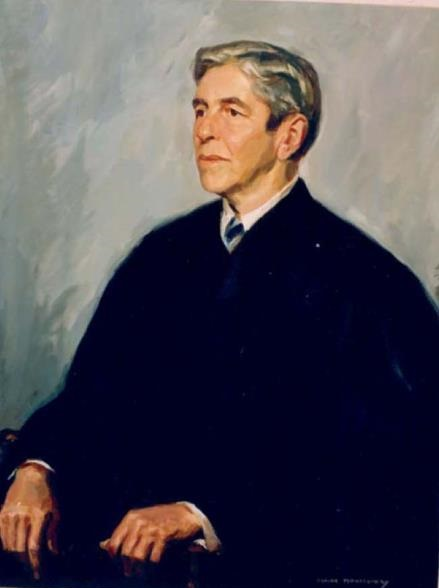
Edward Thaxter Gignoux

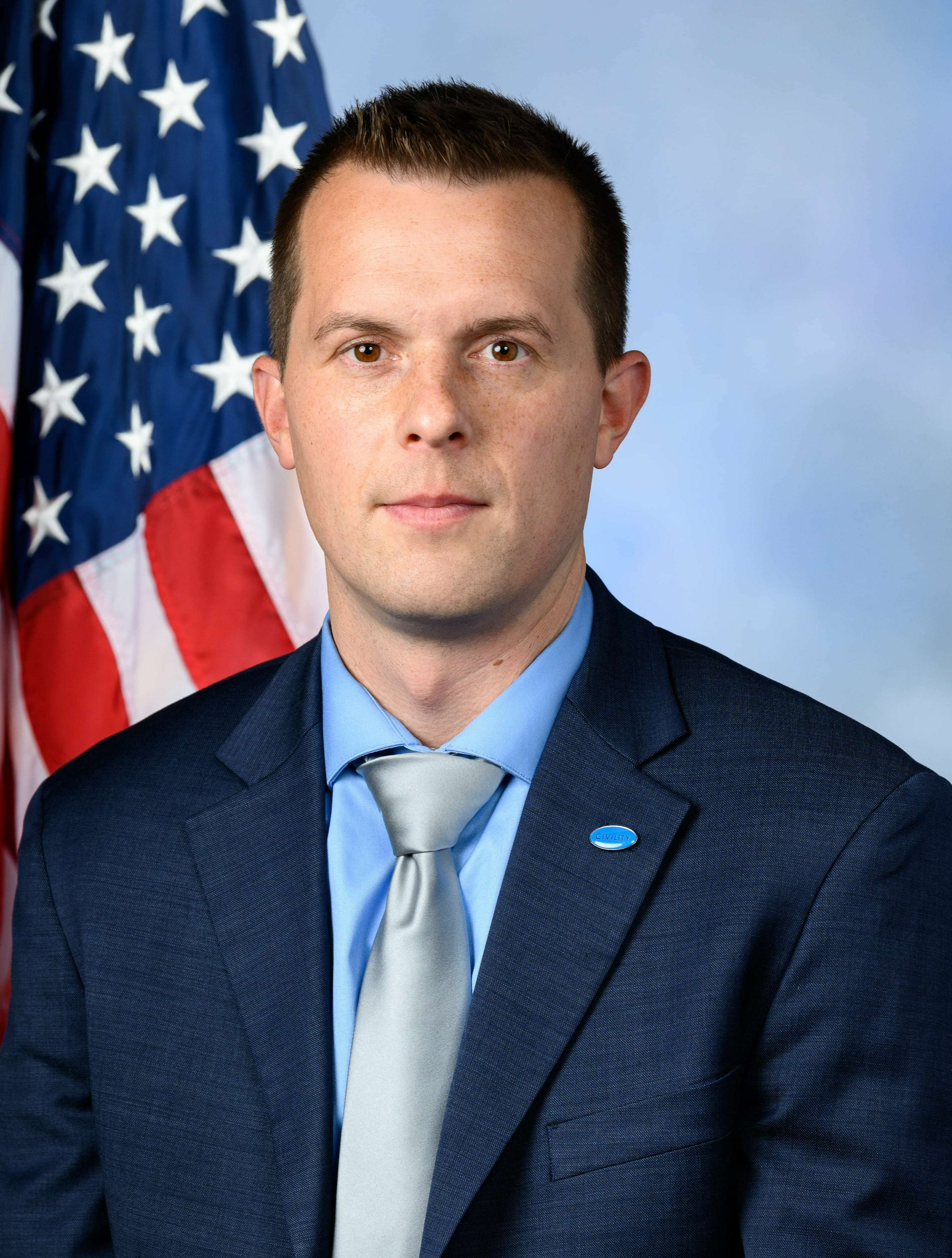
Jared Golden

- Joey Gamache (born 1966), lightweight champion who boxed from 1976 to 2000; originally from Lewiston
- Peter A. Garland (1923–2005), politician, congressman (1961–1963); lived in Brunswick
- Scott Garland (born 1973), WWE wrestler, ring name Scotty 2 Hotty; born in Westbrook
- Gladys George (1904–1954), actress, The Maltese Falcon, The Best Years of Our Lives; born in Patten
- Frank Bunker Gilbreth, Sr. (1868–1924), early advocate of scientific management and pioneer of motion study; born in Fairfield
- Jon Gillies (born 1994), professional hockey player; raised in South Portland
- Edward Thaxter Gignoux (1916 –1988) , U.S. district judge of the United States District Court for the District of Maine
- Everett Glass (1891–1966), actor; born in Bangor
- Charles Goddard (1879–1951), playwright and screenwriter for silent films; born in Portland
- Jared Golden (born 1982), Marine veteran, politician, congressman (2019–); lives in Lewiston
- George Gore (1854–1933), professional baseball player; born in Saccarappa
- Gary Gordon (1960–1993), master sergeant in the U.S. Army who died during Operation Gothic Serpent; born in Lincoln
- Noah Gray-Cabey (born 1995), teen actor, My Wife and Kids, Heroes; raised in Newry
- Chris Greeley (1962–2023), politician, Cosmopolitan magazine's Bachelor of the Month in June 1993; appeared on multiple TV shows in the 1990s
- Mace Greenleaf (1872–1912), stage and screen actor in silent films; born in Dixfield
- Patty Griffin (born 1964), Grammy Award-winning singer-songwriter and musician; born in Old Town
- Einar Gustafson (1935–2001), childhood cancer patient, namesake of The Jimmy Fund; born and raised in New Sweden

== H ==
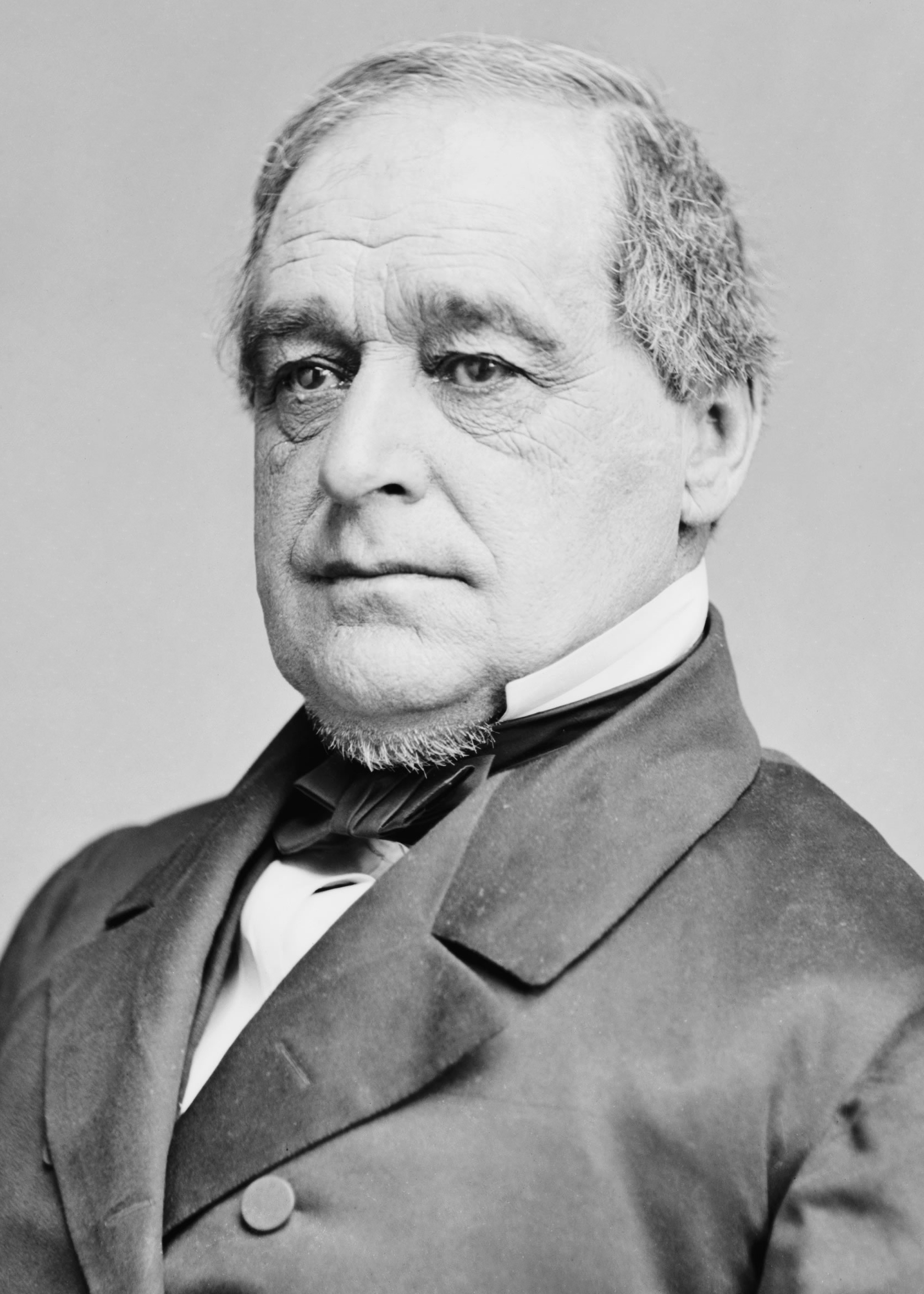
Hannibal Hamlin

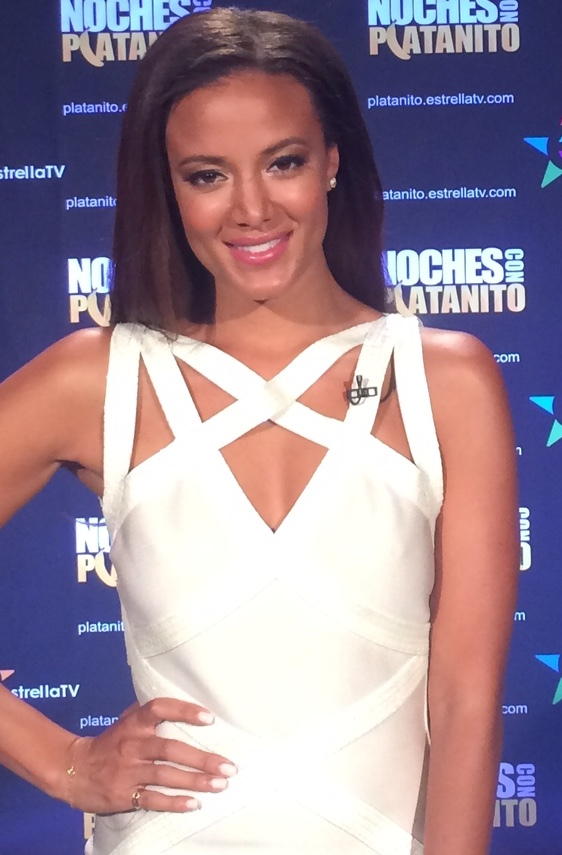
Heather Hemmens

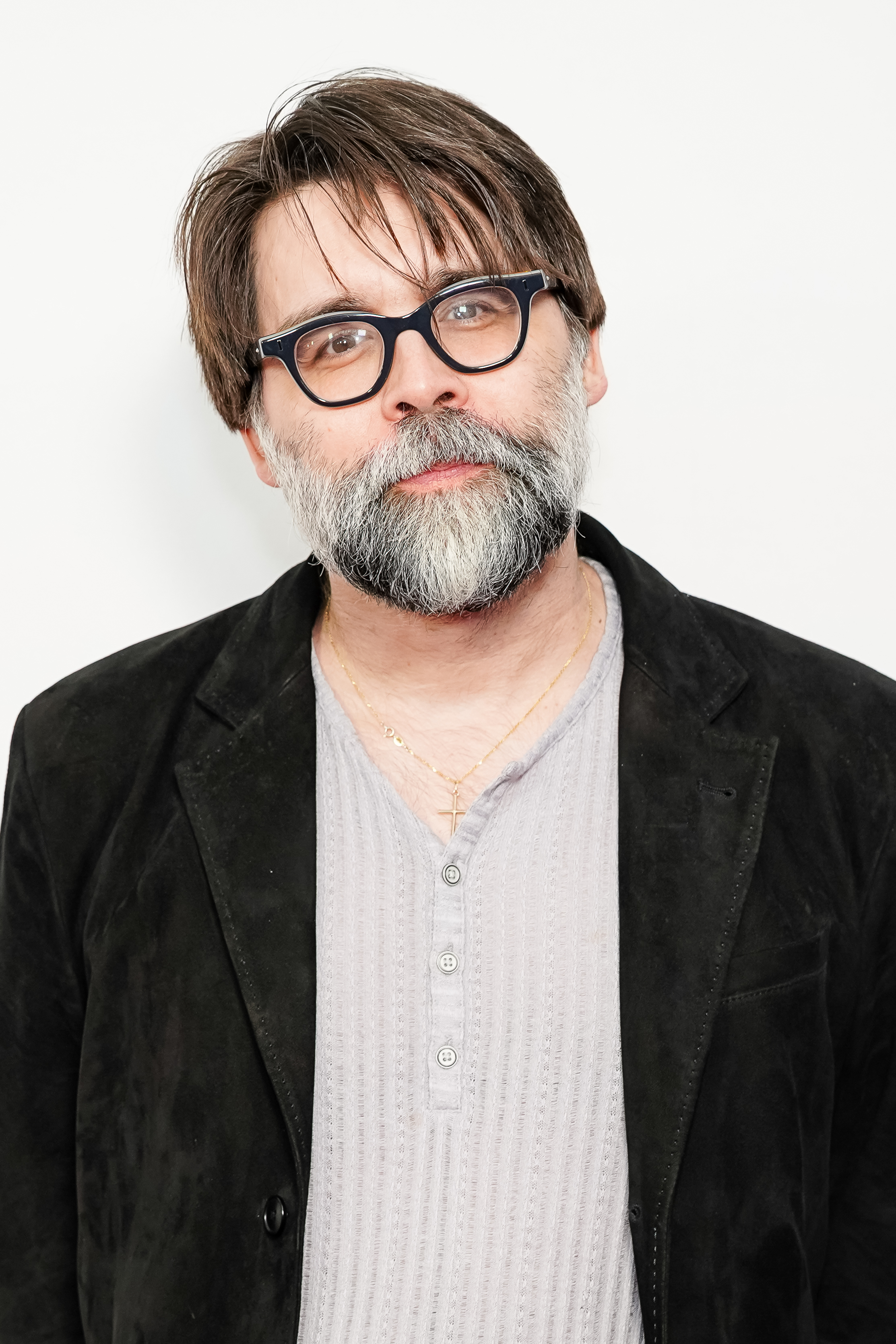
Joe Hill

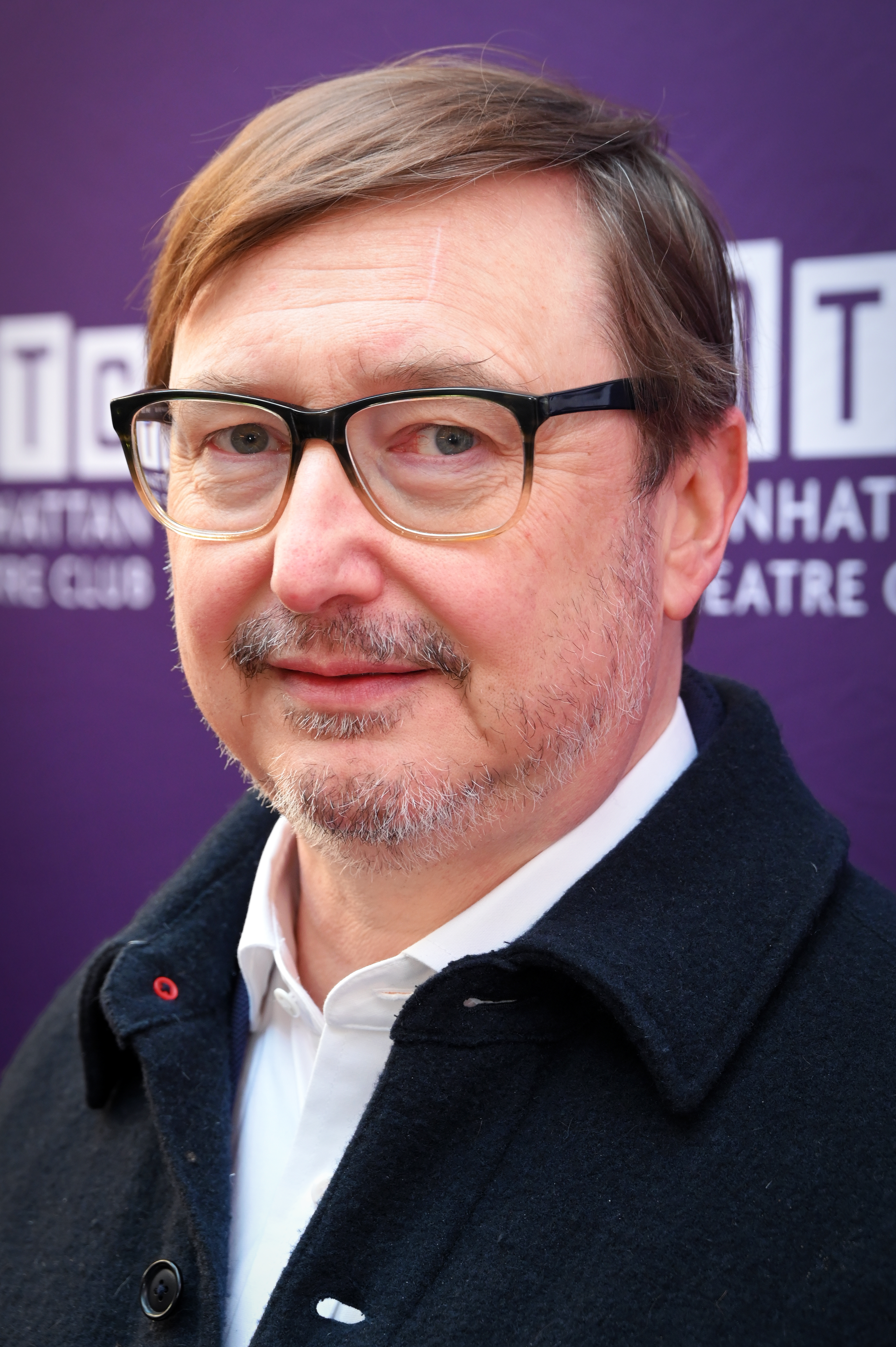
John Hodgman

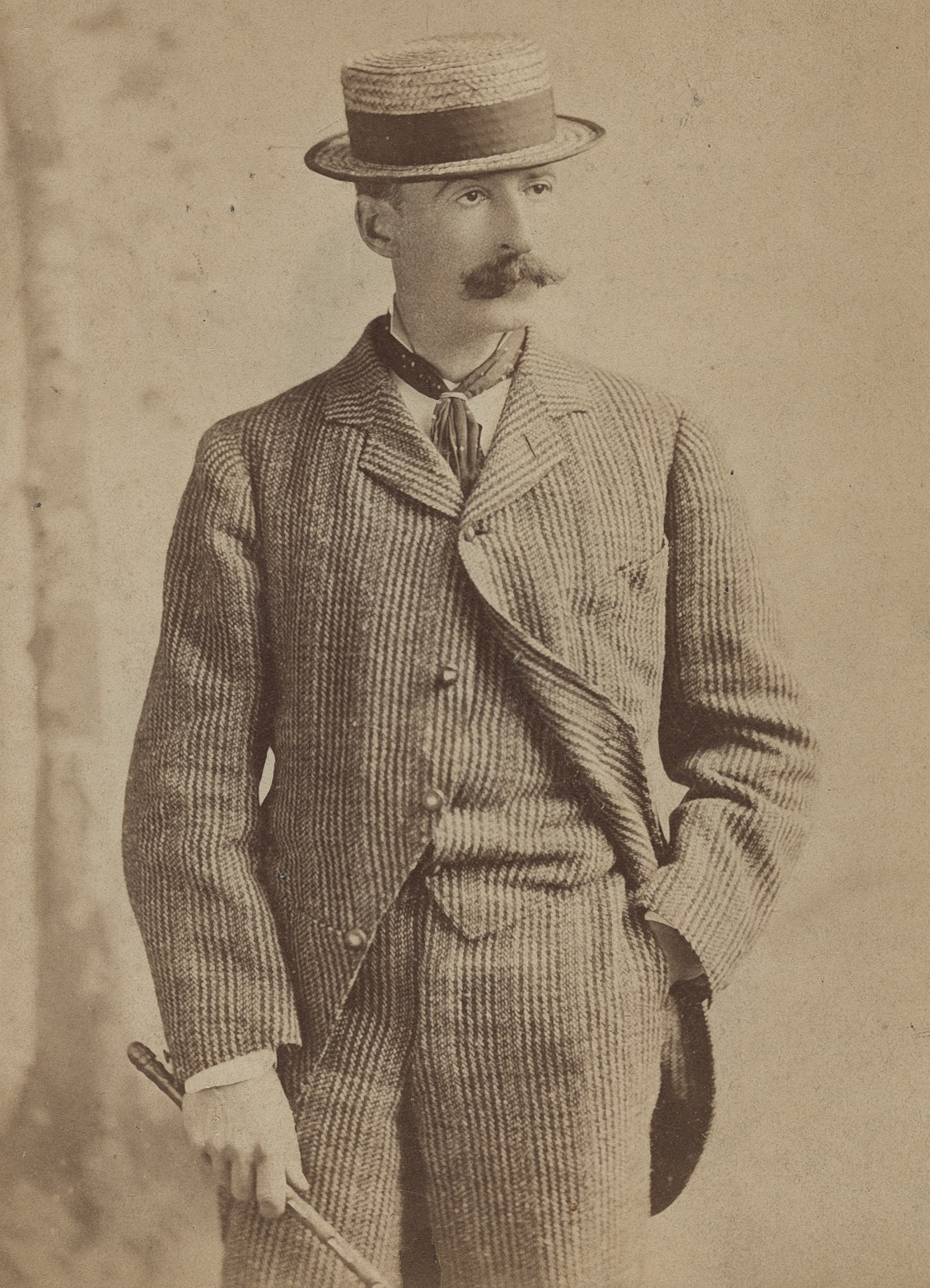
Winslow Homer

- Edwin Hall (1855–1938), physicist who discovered the "Hall effect"; born in Gorham
- John H. Hall (1781–1841), inventor of the M1819 Hall breech-loading rifle; mass production innovator; born in Portland
- Hannibal Hamlin (1809–1891), 15th vice president of the United States and U.S. senator; born in Paris
- Simon Hamlin (1866–1939), politician, congressman (1935–1937); born in Standish
- Frank Handlen (1916–2023), artist and shipwright; born in Brooklyn
- Al Harris (born 1956), former professional football player and coach; born in Bangor
- Marsden Hartley (1877–1943), artist, poet; born in Lewiston
- George Haskins (1915–1991), law professor at the University of Pennsylvania Law School
- Juliana Hatfield (born 1967), guitarist and singer-songwriter; born in Wiscasset
- Garnet Hathaway (born 1991), professional hockey player; raised in Kennebunkport
- Benjamin Franklin Hayes (1836–1901), legislator and judge; born in Berwick
- Frederick Hayes (1842–1911), Civil War veteran, awarded medal of honor; born in Berwick
- John Alfred Hayes (1839–1913), Union Army physician; born in Berwick
- Heather Hemmens (born 1988), actress, Hellcats; raised in Waldo
- James Chico Hernandez (born 1954), sambo martial artist; resides in Washburn
- Richard Herrick (1931–1963), received the first successful organ transplant from identical twin brother Ronald Herrick in 1954; born and lived in Maine
- Ira G. Hersey (1858–1943), US congressman; born in Hodgdon
- Charlie Hewitt (born 1946), artist; born in Lewiston
- Joe Hill (born 1971), horror novelist; born in Hermon
- Stan Hindman (1944–2020), professional football player; born in Houlton
- John Hodgman (born 1971), actor, writer and comedian; lives in Brooklin
- Mackenzie Holmes (born 2000), professional basketball player; born in Gorham
- Will Holt (1929–2015), singer-songwriter, librettist and lyricist; born in Portland
- Winslow Homer (1836–1910), 19th-century painter; lived in Prouts Neck
- Jean E. Howard (born 1948), George Delacorte Professor of the Humanities at Columbia University; born in Houlton
- DebraLee Hovey (born 1954), Connecticut state representative
- Oliver Otis Howard (1830–1909), United States Army officer and Union general; born in Leeds
- Caroline Dana Howe (1824–1907), writer, poet, hymnwriter; born in Fryeburg
- Frank M. Hume, colonel; commanding officer of the 103rd Infantry, 26th Division during World War I; born in Bridgewater; died in Houlton
- Helen Marr Hurd (1839–1909), educator, poet; born in Harmony; died in St. Albans
- Patricia Hymanson, physician and Member of the Maine House of Representatives

== I ==
- Robert Indiana (1928–2018), pop artist; lived in Vinalhaven
- Happy Iott (1876–1941), Major League Baseball outfielder; born in Houlton; died in Island Falls
- Dahlov Ipcar (née Zorach; 1917–2017), artist and author

== J ==
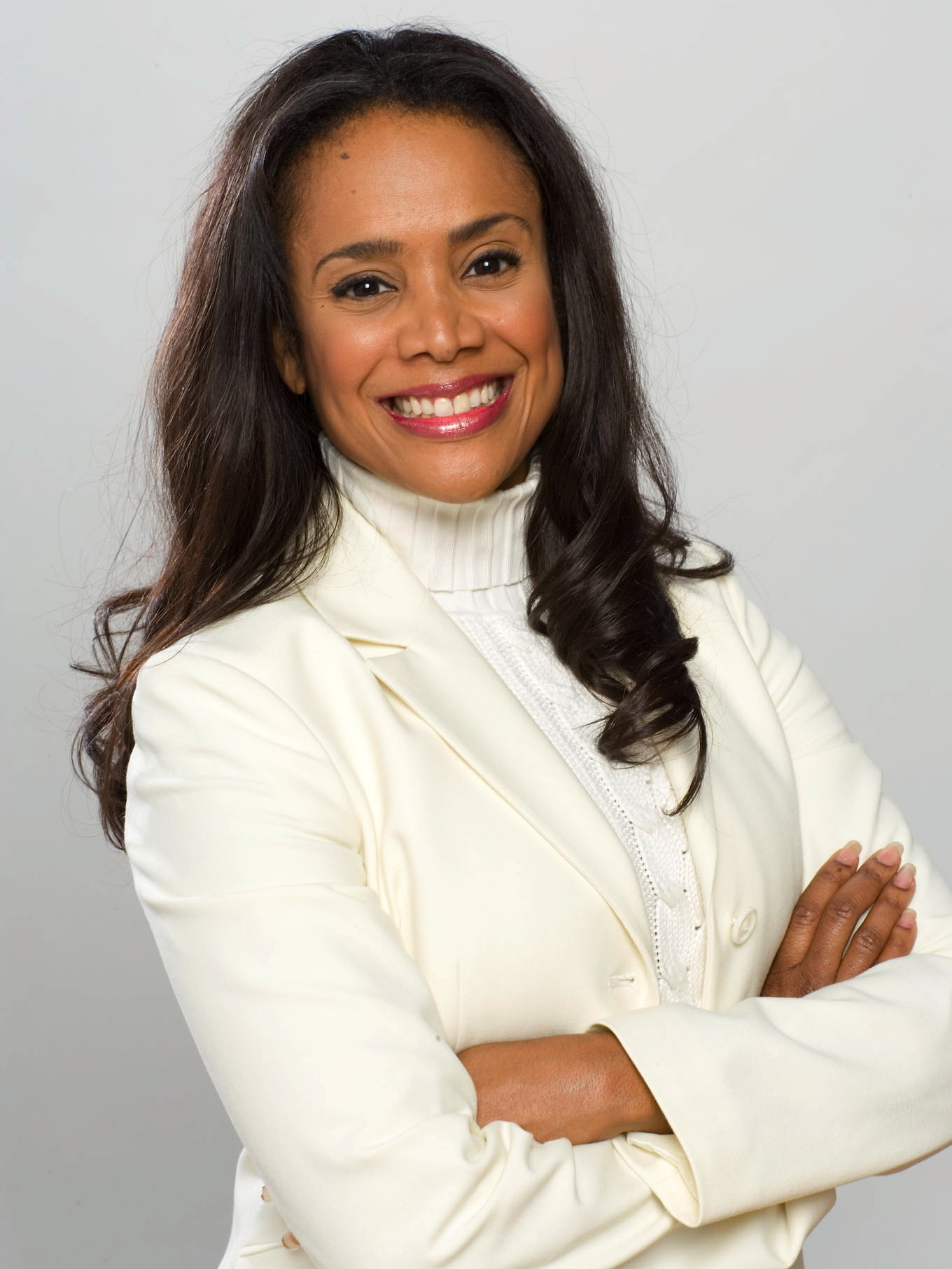
Sandi Jackson

- Sandi Jackson (born 1963), politician, former member of the Chicago City Council; born in Kittery
- Troy Jackson (born 1968), politician, former president of the Maine Senate; lives in Allagash
- Theodora R. Jenness (1847–1935), writer, editor; born in Greenwood
- Sarah Orne Jewett (1849–1909), novelist and short story writer; lived in South Berwick
- Jigger Johnson (1871–1935), logger and American folk hero known for his numerous off-the-job exploits; born in Fryeburg

== K ==
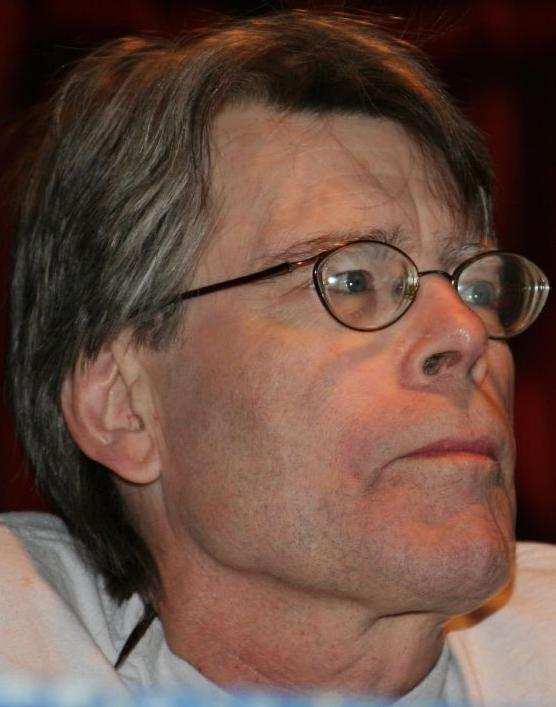
Stephen King

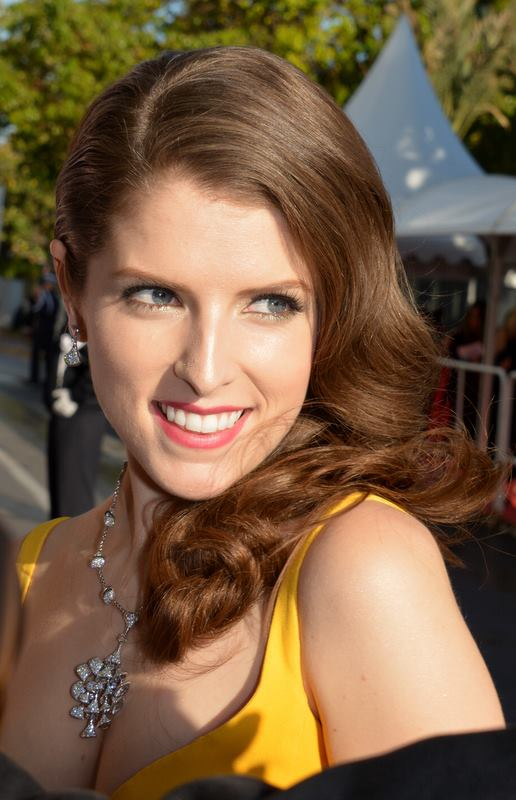
Anna Kendrick

- Emily Kagan (born 1981), mixed martial artist
- Natalie Kalmus (1882–1965), "color supervisor" of virtually all Technicolor feature films made from 1934 to 1949; born in Houlton
- Linda Kasabian (born 1949), member of Charles Manson's "family"; born in Biddeford
- Alton Kelley (1940–2008), psychedelic poster artist; born in Houlton
- David E. Kelley (born 1956), Emmy-winning television producer and writer; born in Waterville
- Anna Kendrick (born 1985), Oscar-nominated actress; born in Portland
- Matthew Kenney (born 1964), celebrity chef, author, educator and entrepreneur; raised in Searsport
- Sumner Kimball (1834–1923), general supt. of U.S. Life-Saving Service; born in Lebanon; raised in Sanford
- Matt Kinney (born 1976), former professional baseball player; born in Bangor
- Angus King (born 1944), governor of Maine (1995–2003), US senator from Maine (since 2013); lives in Brunswick
- Owen King (born 1977), author; raised in Bangor
- Stephen King (born 1947), novelist whose books have sold more than 350 million copies; born in Portland; raised in Durham; lives in Bangor
- Tabitha King (born 1949), novelist, wife of Stephen King; born in Old Town; lives in Bangor
- William King (1788–1852), politician, first Governor of Maine (1820–1821); born in Scarborough

== L ==
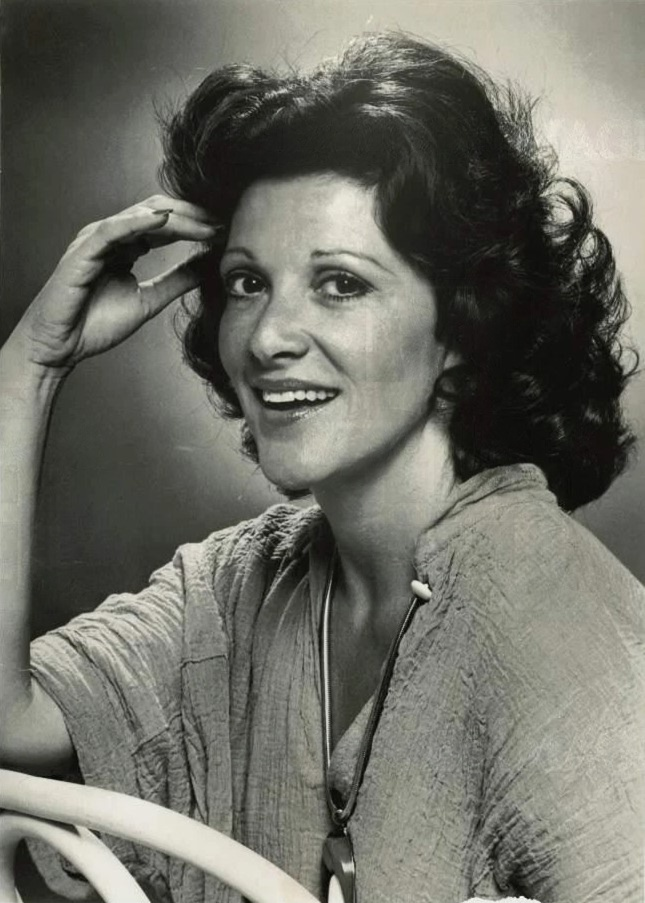
Linda Lavin

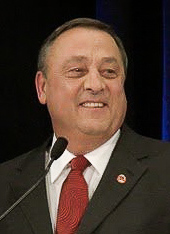
Paul LePage

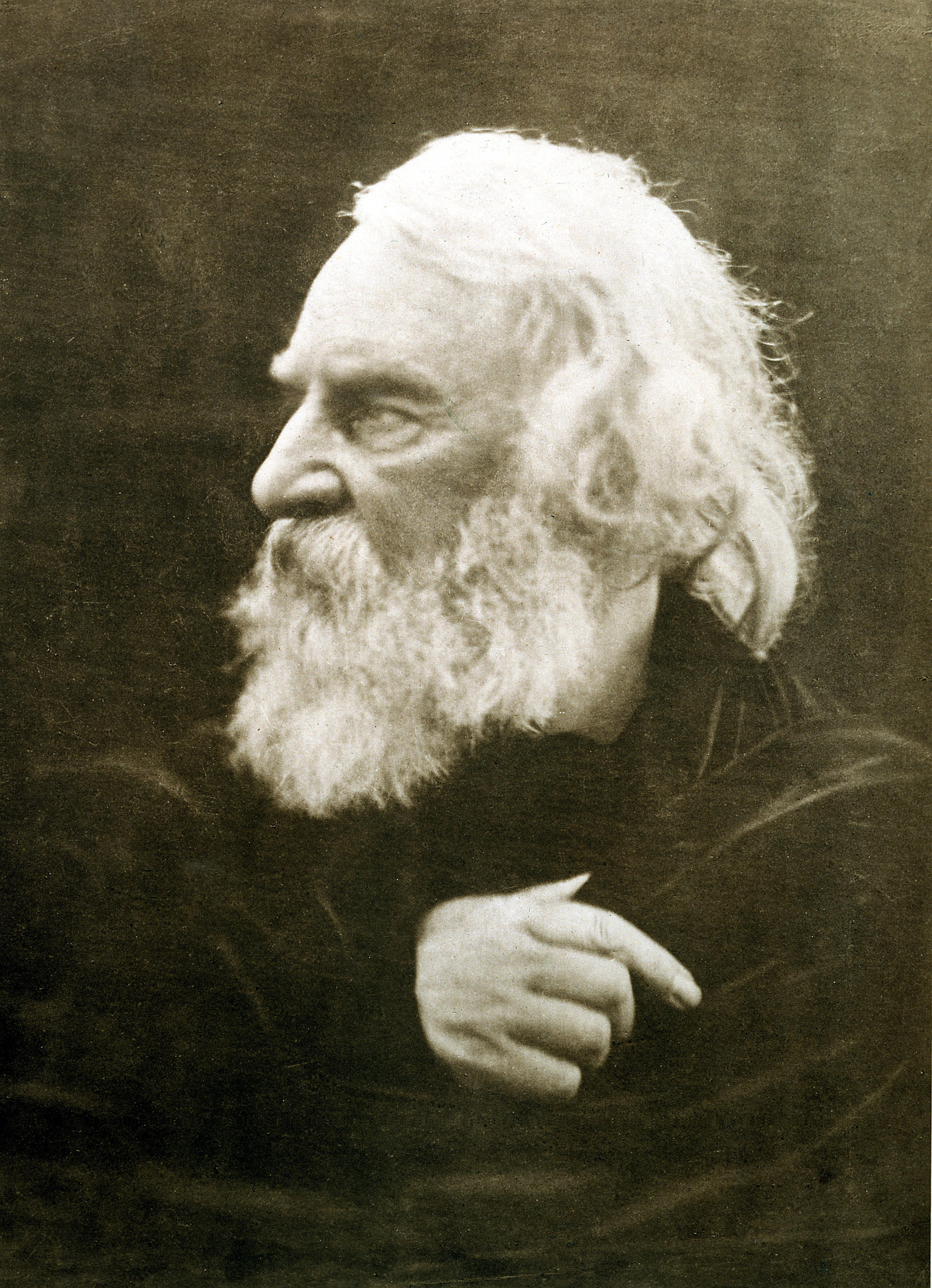
Henry Wadsworth Longfellow

- Pete Ladd (1956–2023), professional baseball player; born in Portland
- Thomas Lavigne, state legislator; lives in Berwick
- Linda Lavin (1937–2024), actress, Alice, six-time Tony Award nominee; born and raised in Portland
- Abby Fisher Leavitt (1836–1897), social reformer, newspaper publisher; born in Bangor
- Bud Leavitt Jr. (1917–1994), Bangor sportswriter, outdoor columnist, television host
- Ray Lemek (1934–2005), professional football player; lived in Readfield
- Paul LePage (born 1948), politician, governor of Maine (2011–2019), mayor of Waterville (2003–2011); born in Lewiston
- Jonathan Lethem (born 1964), writer; lives in Berwick
- Roger Levesque (born 1981), former professional soccer player; born in Portland
- Enoch Lincoln (1788–1829), politician, governor of Maine (1827–1829), US congressman (1818–1826); lived in Augusta
- Tawny Little (born 1956), 1976 Miss America, television journalist; born in Portland
- Elle Logan (born 1987), 2008, 2012 and 2016 Olympic gold medalist in women's rowing; born in Portland
- Alvin Orlando Lombard (1856–1937), inventor of continuous tracked vehicles; born in Springfield
- Henry Wadsworth Longfellow (1807–1882), poet; born and raised in Portland; attended Bowdoin College
- James B. Longley (1924–1980), first Independent governor of Maine (1975–1979); born in Bangor
- James B. Longley Jr. (born 1951), politician, congressman (1995–1997); born in Lewiston
- Barry B. Longyear (1942–2025), novelist, author of Enemy Mine; lived in New Sharon
- Bob Ludwig (born 1945), audio mastering engineer, founder of Gateway Mastering and DVD in Portland
- Alphonso M. Lunt (1837–1917), Army sergeant; born in Berwick

== M ==
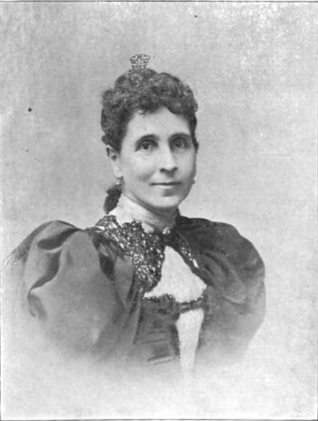
Ella M. S. Marble

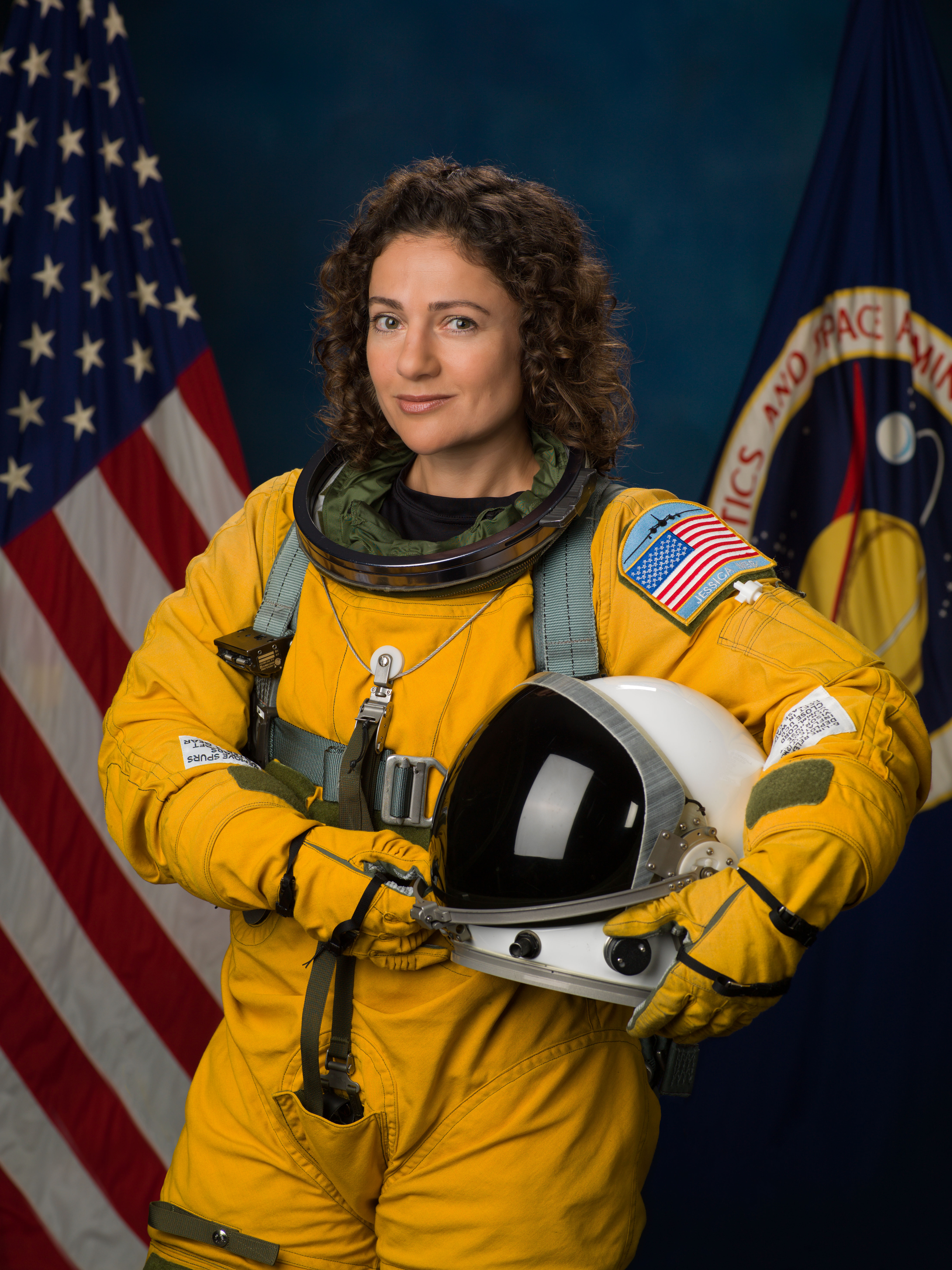
Jessica Meir

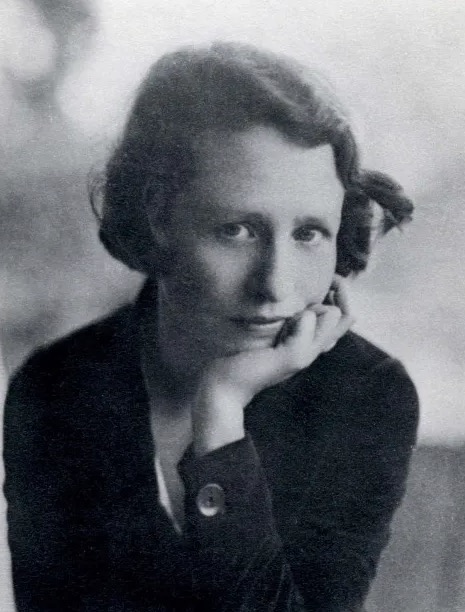
Edna St. Vincent Millay

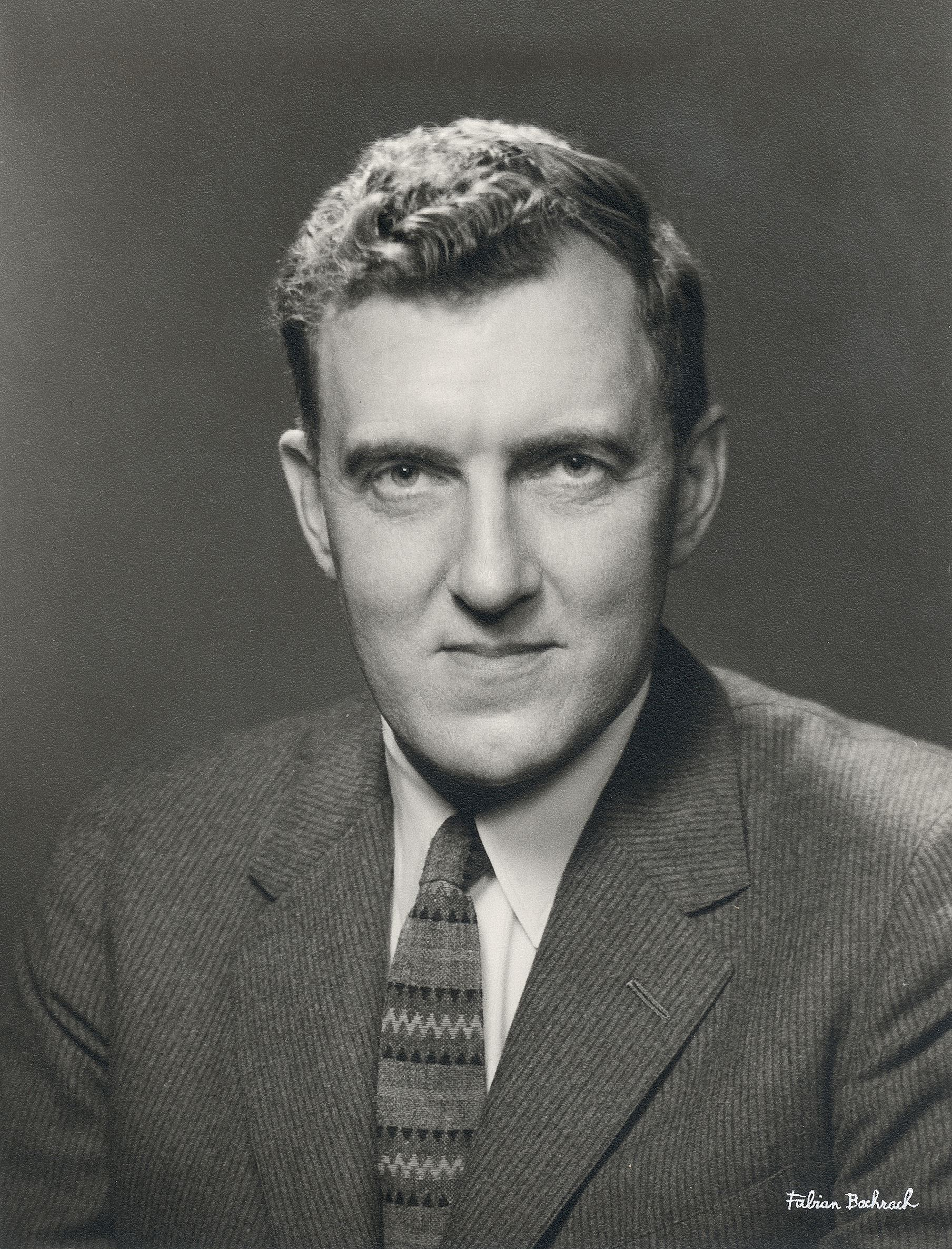
Edmund Muskie

- Marc Macaulay (born 1957), actor, Burn Notice; born in Millinocket
- Frances Laughton Mace (1836–1899), poet; born in Orono
- Dick MacPherson (1930–2017), football coach; born in Old Town
- Nicole Maines (born 1997), actress, Supergirl, LGBT rights activist; lives in Portland
- Lester D. Mallory (1904–1994), diplomat; born in Houlton
- Ella M. S. Marble (1850–1929), physician; born in Gorham; died in Paris
- Bob Marley (born 1967), stand-up comedian; from Portland; born in Bangor
- Andrea Martin (born 1947), actress, comedian, voice actress, SCTV, My Big Fat Greek Wedding, Kim Possible, Earthworm Jim; born in Portland
- Steve Martin (born 1952), sportscaster; born in Millinocket
- Garrett Mason (born 1985) , Majority Leader of the Maine Senate
- H.S. Maxim (1840–1916), inventor of Maxim gun; born in Sangerville
- Chloe Maxmin (born 1992), Member of the Maine Senate
- Julia Harris May (1833–1912), poet, teacher, founder; born in Strong
- Mary Mayhew (born 1965) , Commissioner of Maine Department of Health and Human Services
- Robert McCloskey (1914-2003), author and illustrator; summered on Scott Island and died in Deer Isle.
- David McCullough (1933–2022), author, historian, Pulitzer Prize winner; lived in Camden
- Cynthia McFadden (born 1956), co-anchor of Nightline and Primetime; born in Lewiston
- Mike McHugh (born 1965), former professional hockey player; born in Bowdoin
- John McKernan (born 1948), politician, governor of Maine (1987–1995), congressman (1983–1987); born in Bangor
- Victor McKusick (1921–2008), physician, scientist, "father of medical genetics"; born in Parkman
- Vincent McKusick (1921–2014), attorney, chief justice of Maine Supreme Judicial Court; born in Parkman
- Christian McLaughlin (born 1967), TV writer, producer, novelist; born in Houlton
- Don McLean (born 1945), singer-songwriter; lives in Camden
- Vaughn Meader (1936–2004), comedian, impersonator, musician, film actor; born in Waterville
- Jessica Meir (born 1977), marine biologist, physiologist, and NASA astronaut
- Holman Melcher (1841–1905), soldier, businessman, and politician; 35th mayor of Portland
- Henry Clay Merriam (1837–1912), Civil War-era general, awarded the Medal of Honor; born in Houlton
- Estelle M. H. Merrill (1858–1908), journalist, editor; born in Jefferson
- Helen Maud Merrill (1865–1943), litterateur, poet; born in Bangor; died in Portland; died in Portland
- Mike Michaud (born 1955), politician, congressman (2003–2015); lives in East Millinocket
- Edna St. Vincent Millay (1892–1950); poet; born in Rockland
- Janet T. Mills (born 1948); politician, governor of Maine (2019–); born in Farmington
- George J. Mitchell (born 1933), U.S. Senate majority leader, significant player in peace process of Northern Ireland; born in Waterville
- Herb Mitchell (1937–2011), actor, director; born in Bar Harbor
- Will Montgomery (born 1983), former professional football player; born in Brunswick
- Matthew Mulligan (born 1985), former professional football player; born in Bangor and lived in Enfield
- Edmund Muskie (1914–1996); politician, governor and then senator of Maine, and Democratic vice presidential nominee (1968), U.S. secretary of state (1980–1981); born in Rumford

== N ==
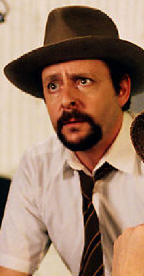
Judd Nelson

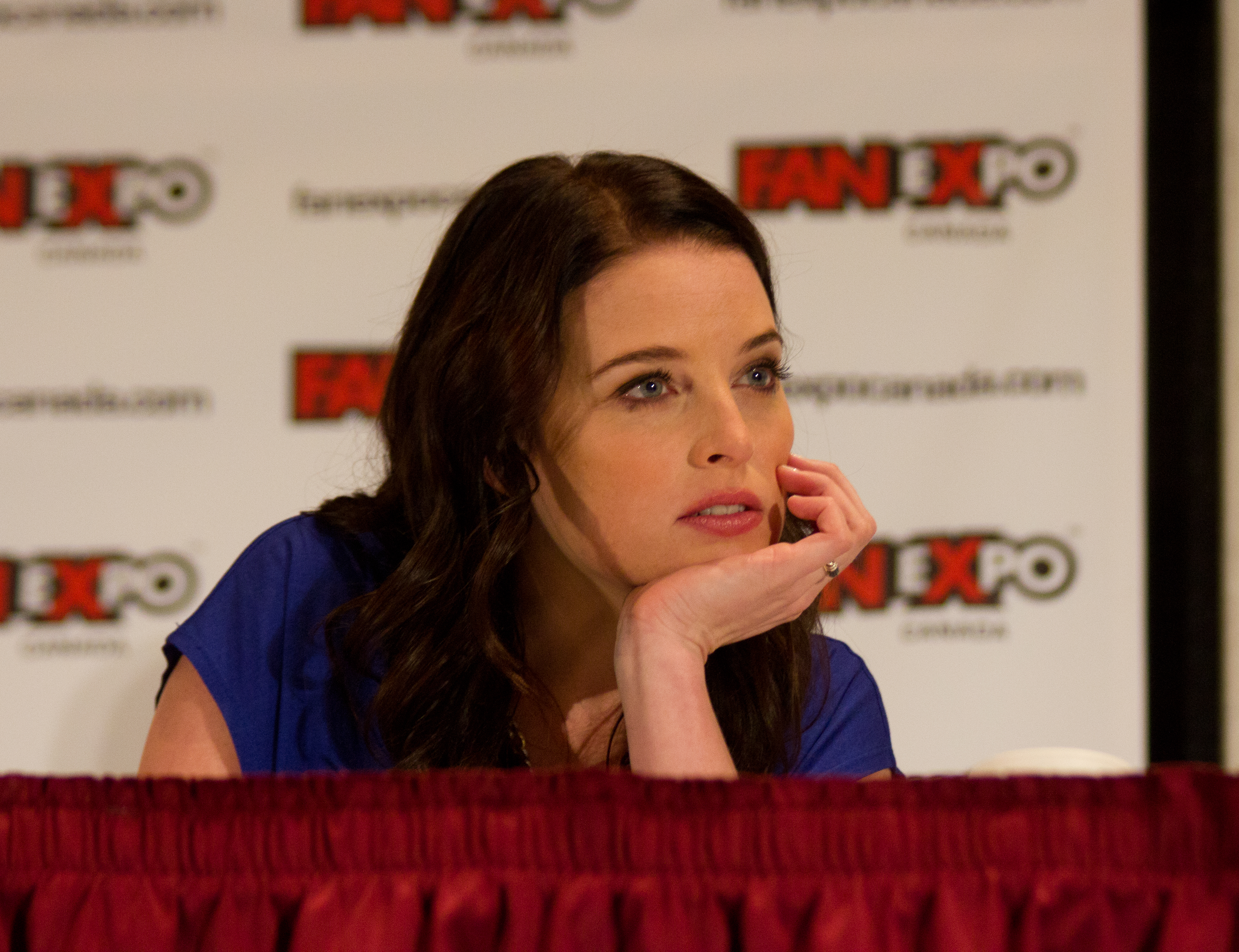
Rachel Nichols

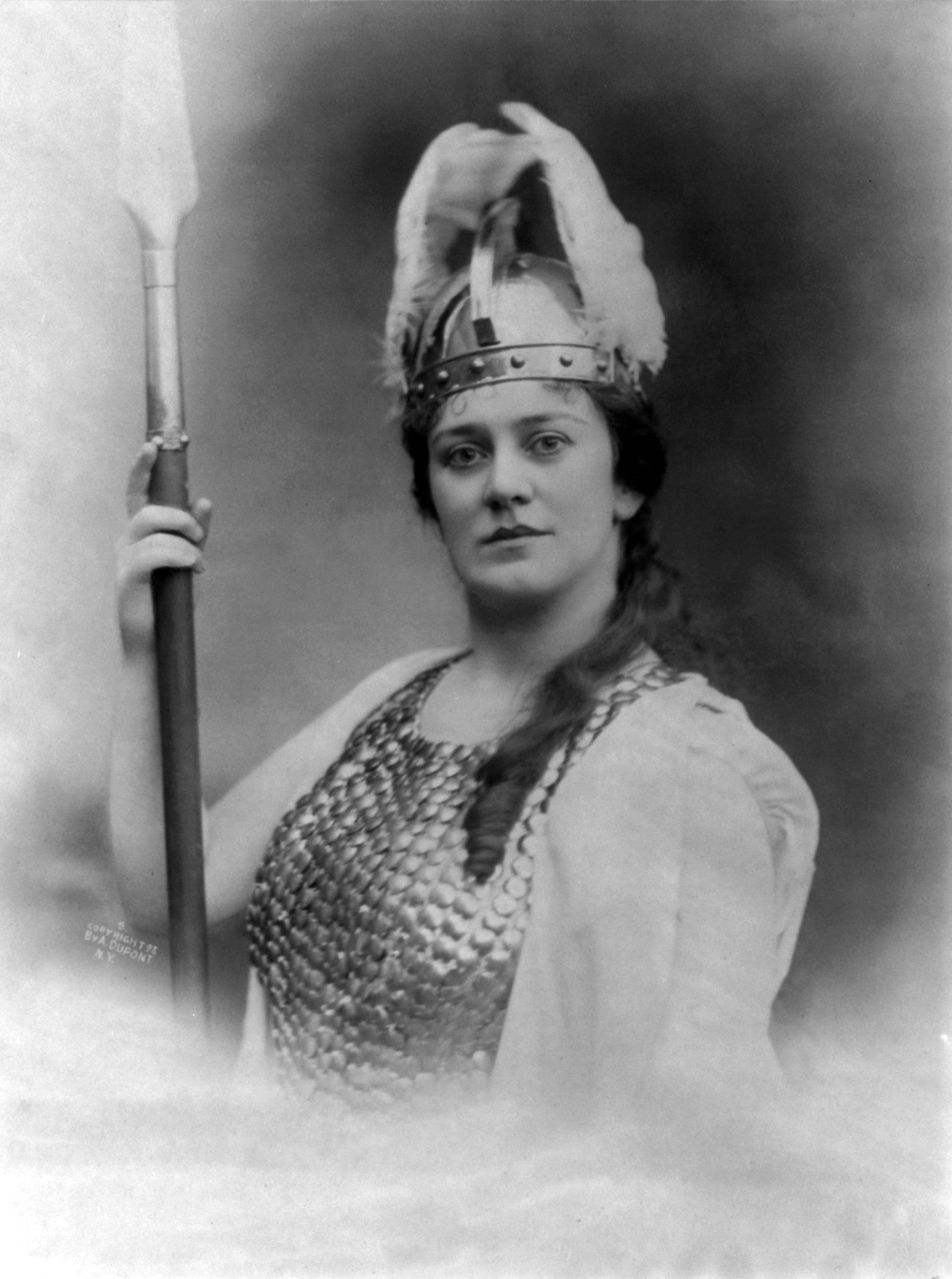
Lillian Nordica

- Emma Huntington Nason (1845–1921), poet, author, musical composer; born in Hallowell
- John Neal (1793–1876), writer, critic, editor, lecturer, and activist; lived entire life in Portland except for sixteen years in Boston, Baltimore, and London
- Judd Nelson (born 1959), actor, The Breakfast Club, Suddenly Susan; born in Portland
- Louise Nevelson (1899–1988), sculptor of found objects; came to Maine when she was five and lived in Rockland
- Rachel Nichols (born 1980), actress, Alias, Star Trek, G.I. Joe: The Rise of Cobra; born and raised in Augusta
- Stephanie Niznik (1967–2019), actress, Everwood, Vanishing Son, Life Is Wild; born in Bangor
- Lillian Nordica (1857–1914), opera singer known as one of the foremost dramatic sopranos of the 19th and 20th centuries; born in Farmington
- William North (1755–1836), Revolutionary soldier, later made a general, aide-de-camp to Friedrich Wilhelm von Steuben, U.S. senator from New York (1798); born in Pemaquid
- Edward Lawry Norton (1898–1983), Bell Labs engineer and scientist famous for developing the concept of the Norton equivalent circuit; born in Rockland

== O ==
- Harry Oakes (1874–1943), discovered second-largest gold mine in Canada; mysteriously murdered in the Bahamas, which became basis of several books and movies; born in Sangerville
- Jeremiah O'Brien (1744–1818), naval officer of American Revolutionary War; born in Kittery
- John O'Hurley (born 1954), actor, voice actor, TV personality; J. Peterman on Seinfeld; born in Kittery
- Wyatt Omsberg (born 1995), professional soccer player; born in Belgrade

== P ==
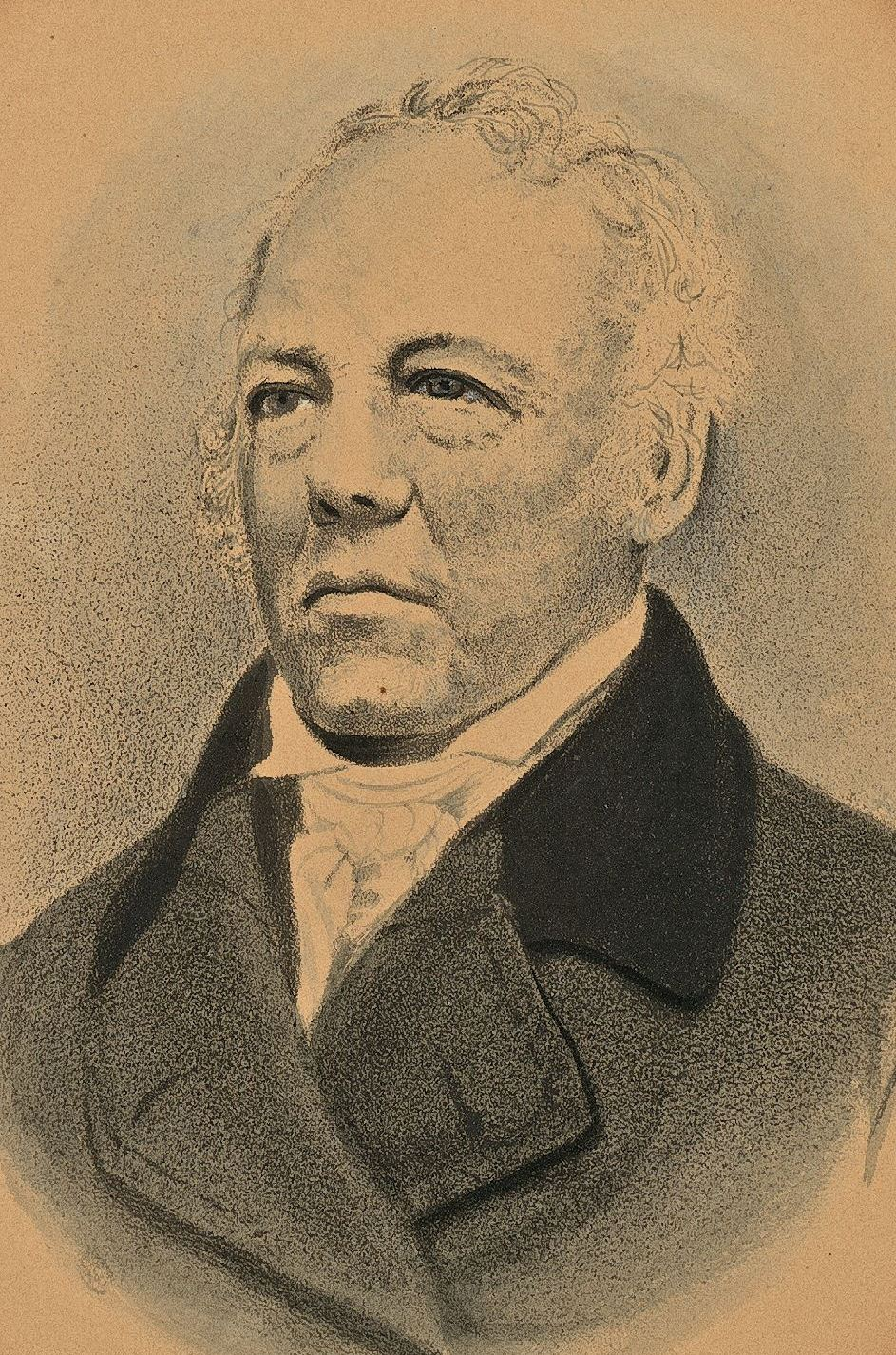
Albion Parris

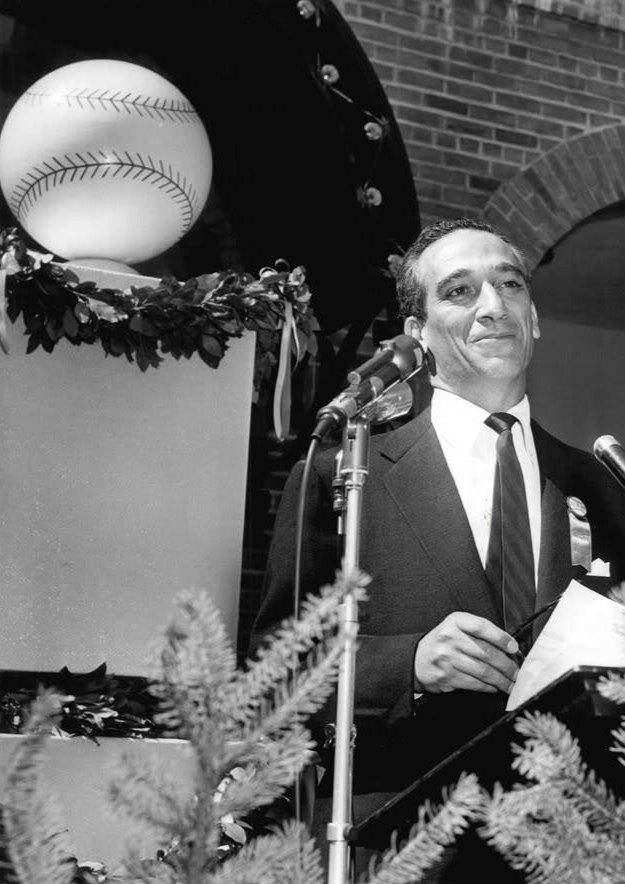
Shirley Povich

- Freddy Parent (1875–1972), professional baseball player; born in Biddeford
- Albion K. Parris (1788–1857), politician, governor of Maine (1822–1827), US senator (1827–1828); born in Hebron
- Gilbert Patten (1866–1945), author of the Frank Merriwell novels; born in Corinna
- Frannie Peabody (1903–2001), HIV/AIDS activist, helped establish the AIDS Project, and co-founded the Peabody House
- Waldo Peirce (1884–1970), artist; born in Bangor; lived most of his life in Maine
- Maynard Pennell (1910–1994), Boeing executive and chief engineer of the 707 prototype; born in Skowhegan
- Greenleaf Whittier Pickard (1877–1956), radio pioneer and 1926 IEEE Medal of Honor winner; born in Portland
- Chellie Pingree (born 1955), politician, congresswoman (since 2009); lives in North Haven
- Hannah Pingree (born 1976), politician, former speaker of the Maine House of Representatives; lives in North Haven
- Bruce Poliquin (born 1953), politician, congressman (2015–2019); born in Waterville, lives in Oakland
- Darryl Pollard (born 1964), former professional football player; born in Ellsworth
- John A. Poor (1808–1871), developer of the Portland gauge Maine railway system; born in Andover
- Bern Porter (1911–2004), artist, writer, publisher, and physicist; born in Houlton
- Quinton Porter (born 1982), former professional football player; born in Portland
- Zach Porter (born 1989), singer-songwriter for Allstar Weekend; born in Bath
- Shirley Povich (1905–1998), sports columnist and reporter for The Washington Post; born in Bar Harbor

== Q ==
- Althea G. Quimby (1858–1942), president, Woman's Christian Temperance Union of Maine; born in Norway
- Colby Quiñones (born 2003), professional soccer player, Portland Hearts of Pine and Puerto Rico national team; born in Biddeford
- Tracy Quint, politician; lives in Hodgdon

== R ==
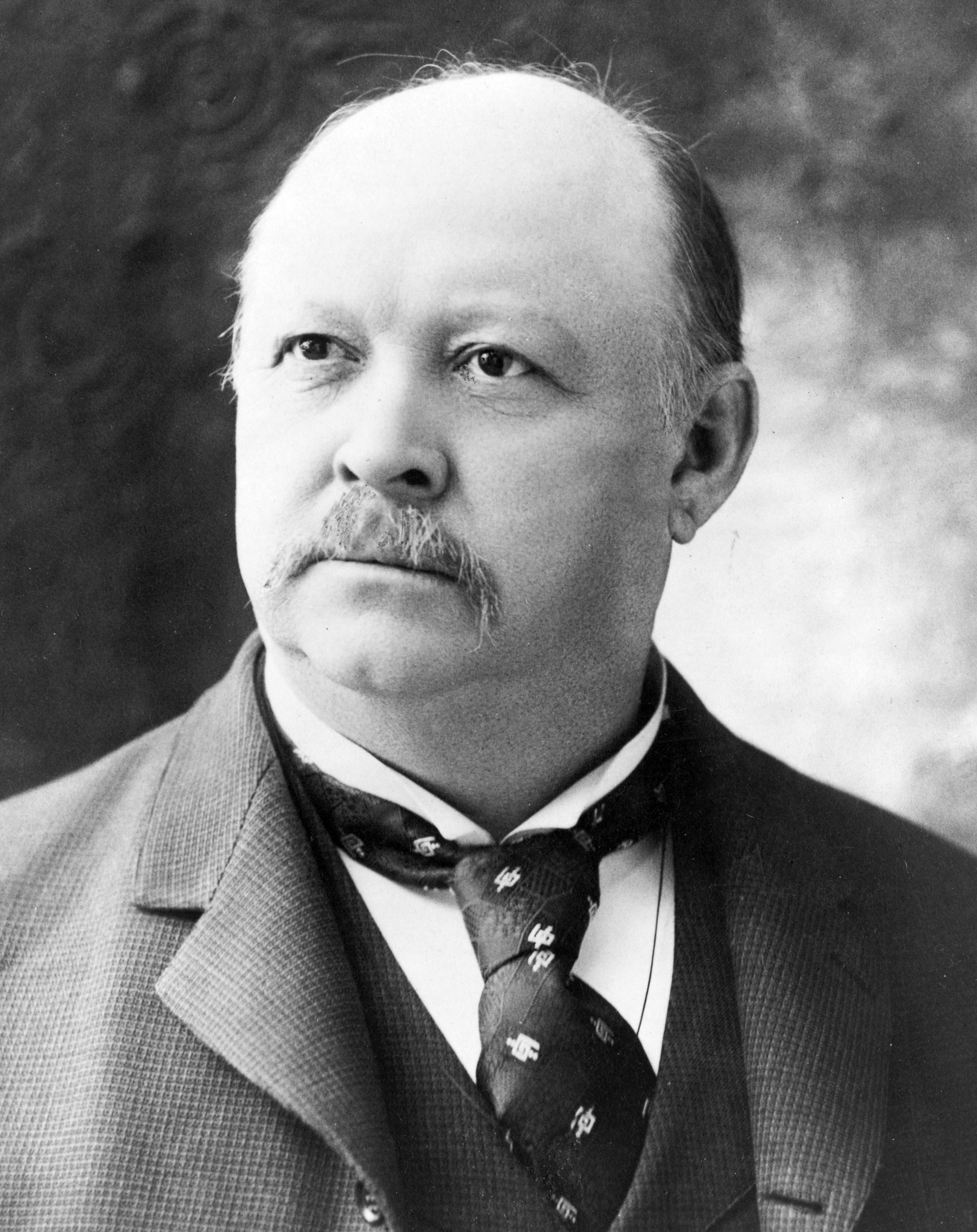
Thomas Brackett Reed

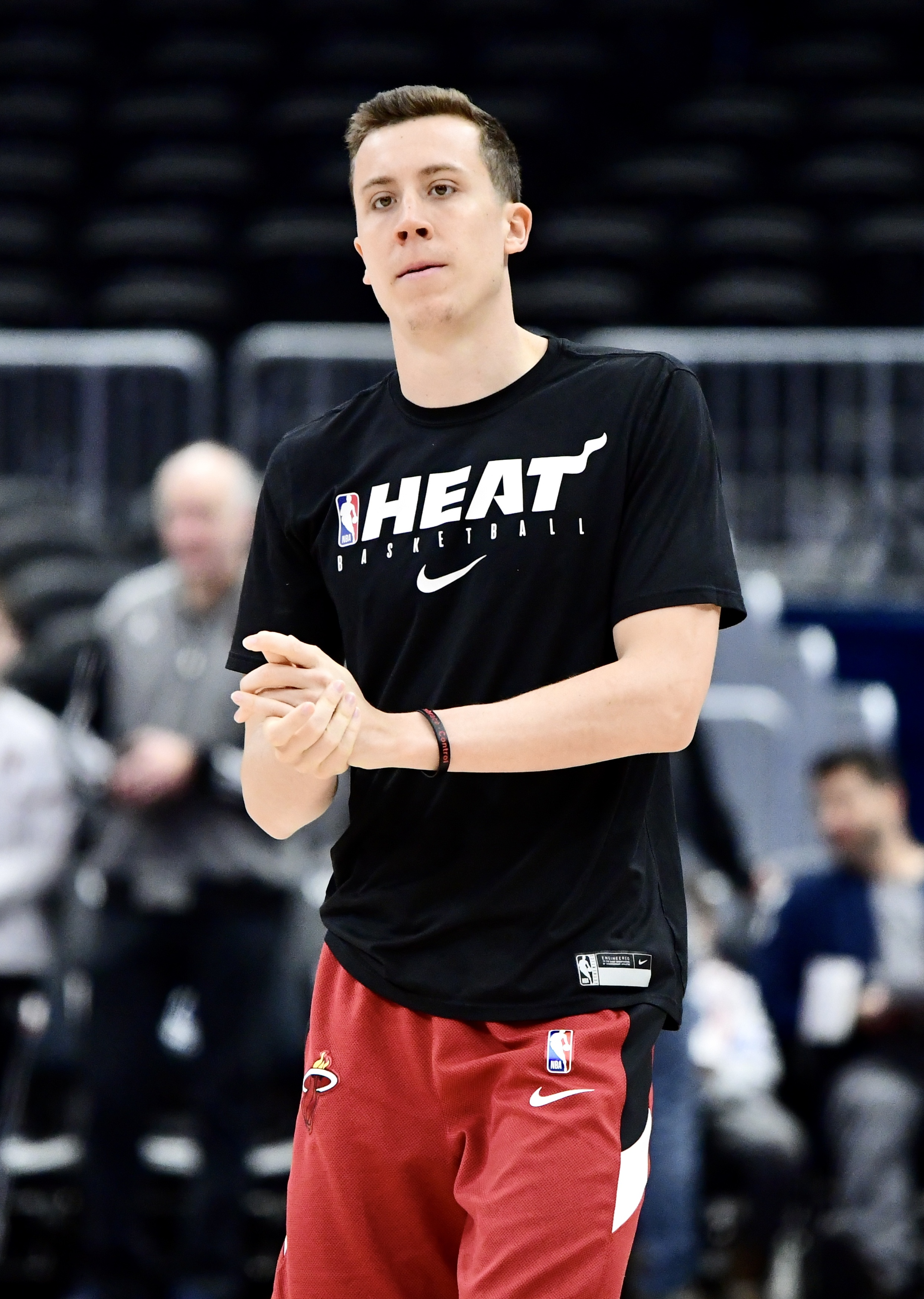
Duncan Robinson

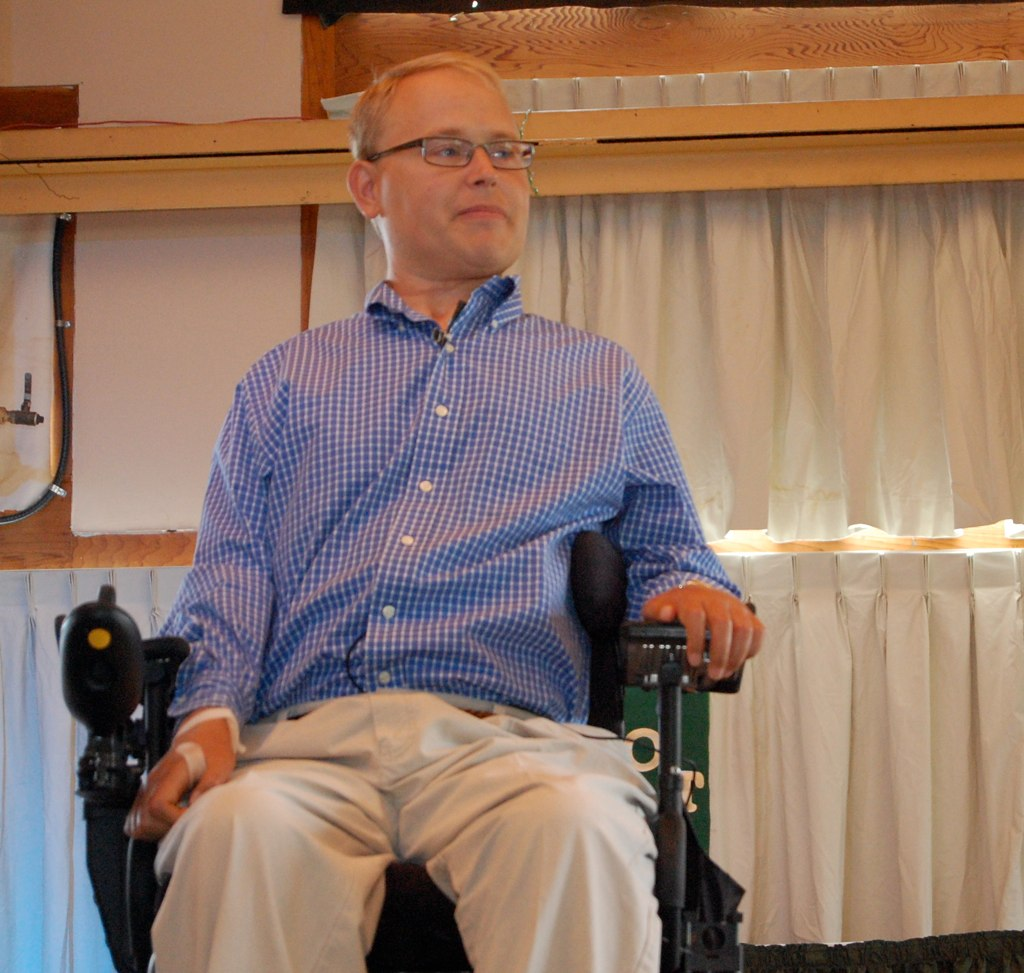
Travis Roy

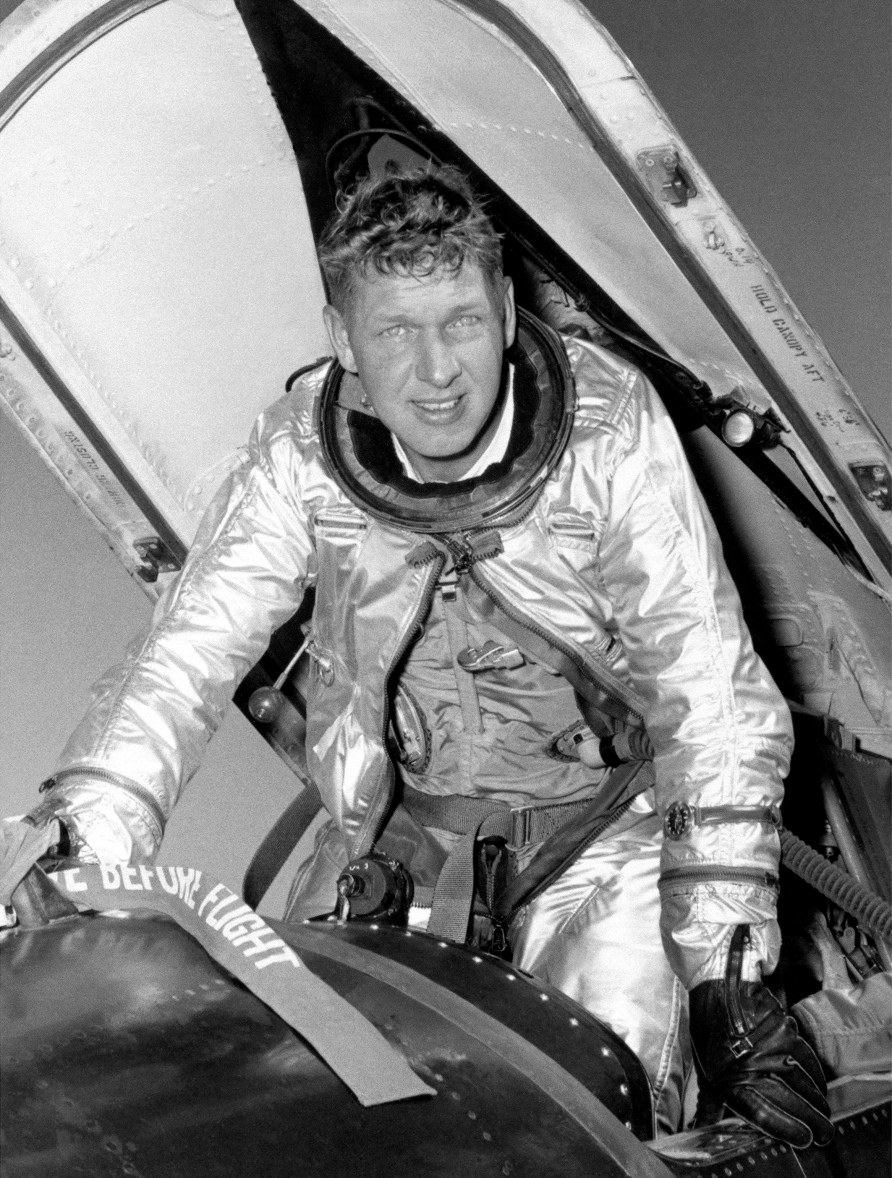
Robert Rushworth

- Esther Ralston (1902–1994), silent film actress; born in Bar Harbor
- Thomas Brackett Reed (1839–1902), U.S. representative from Maine, and speaker of the U.S. House of Representatives, 1889–1891 and 1895–1899; born in Portland
- Ryan Reid (born 1985), former professional baseball player; born in Portland
- Lois Rice (1933–2017), businesswoman and educator, mother of Susan Rice; born in Portland
- Anica Mrose Rissi, author; born in Bangor and raised on Deer Isle.
- Derek Rivers (born 1994), professional football player; born in Augusta
- Aaron Robinson (born 1970), composer; born in Camden and raised in Waldoboro
- Duncan Robinson (born 1994), professional basketball player; born in York
- Edwin Arlington Robinson (1869–1935), poet; born in Alna and raised in Gardiner
- Nelson Rockefeller (1908–1979), businessman, philanthropist, public servant, vice president of the United States (1974–1977) and governor of New York (1959–1973); born in Bar Harbor
- Charles Rocket (1949–2005), actor, Saturday Night Live, Tequila and Bonetti, Dumb and Dumber; born in Bangor
- Lou Rogers (1879–1952), suffrage cartoonist, writer, and radio personality; born in Patten
- Mark Rogers (born 1986), former professional baseball player; born in Brunswick
- Daniel Rose (1772–1835), politician, governor of Maine (1822); lived in Thomaston
- Henrietta Gould Rowe (1834/35–1910), litterateur, author; born in East Corinth
- Victoria Rowell (born 1959), actress, The Young and the Restless, Diagnosis: Murder, Dumb and Dumber; born and raised in Portland
- Travis Roy (1975–2020), college ice hockey player and disability rights activist; born in Augusta
- Robert Rushworth (1924–1993), U.S. Air Force major general and test pilot; born in Madison

== S ==
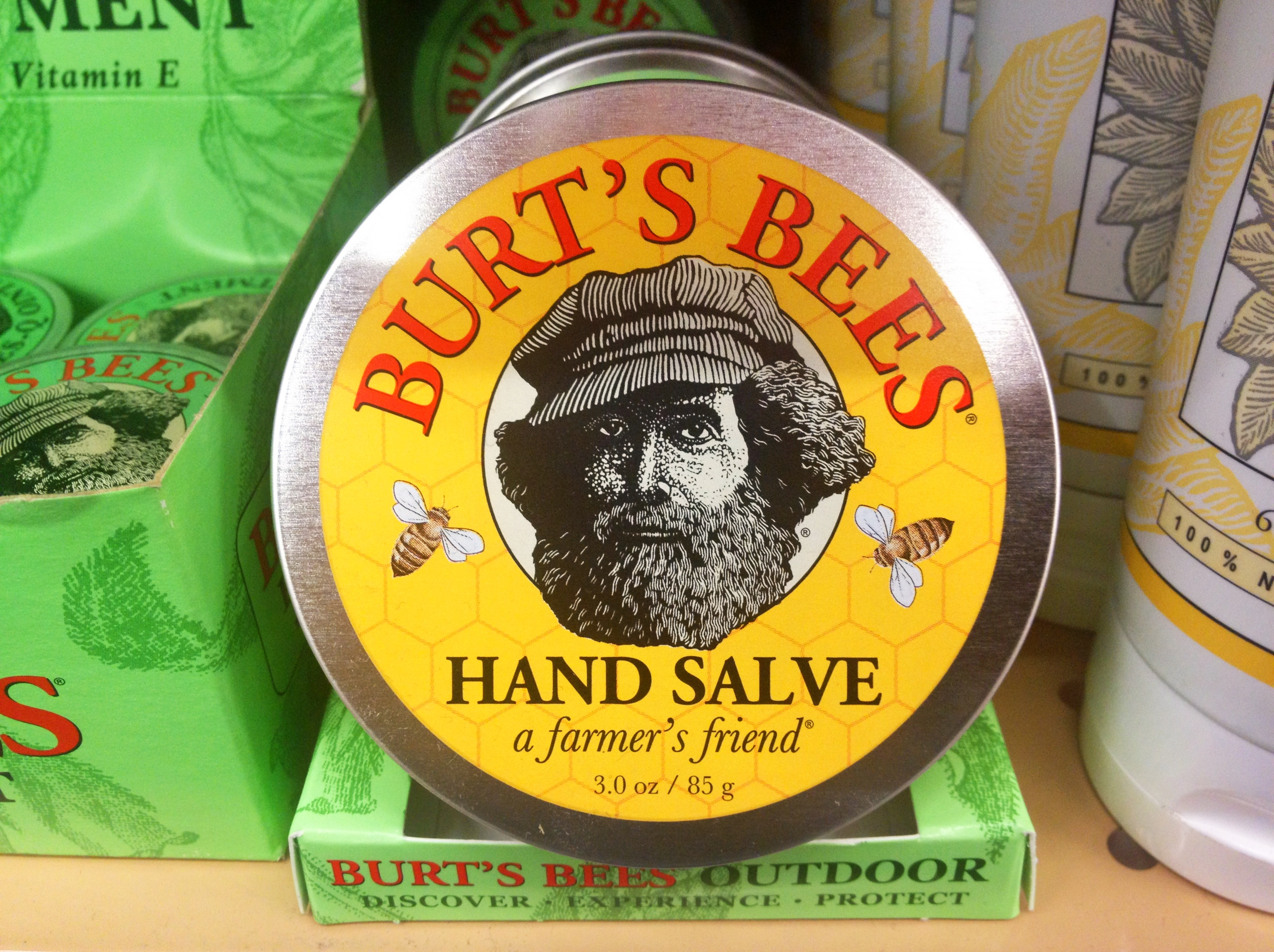
Burt Shavitz

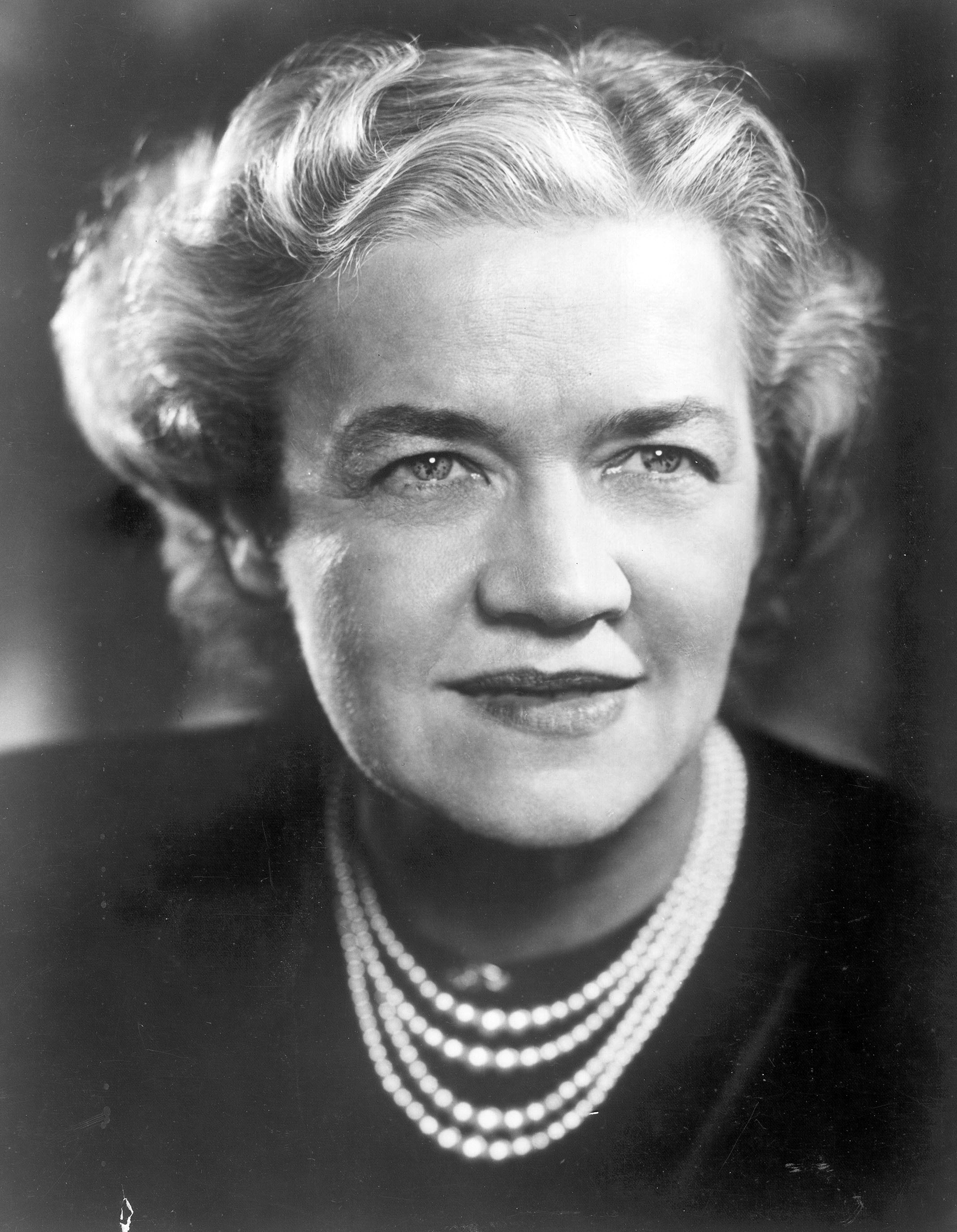
Margaret Chase Smith

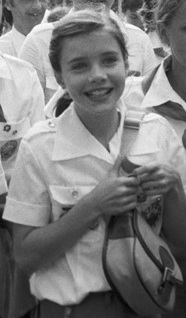
Samantha Smith

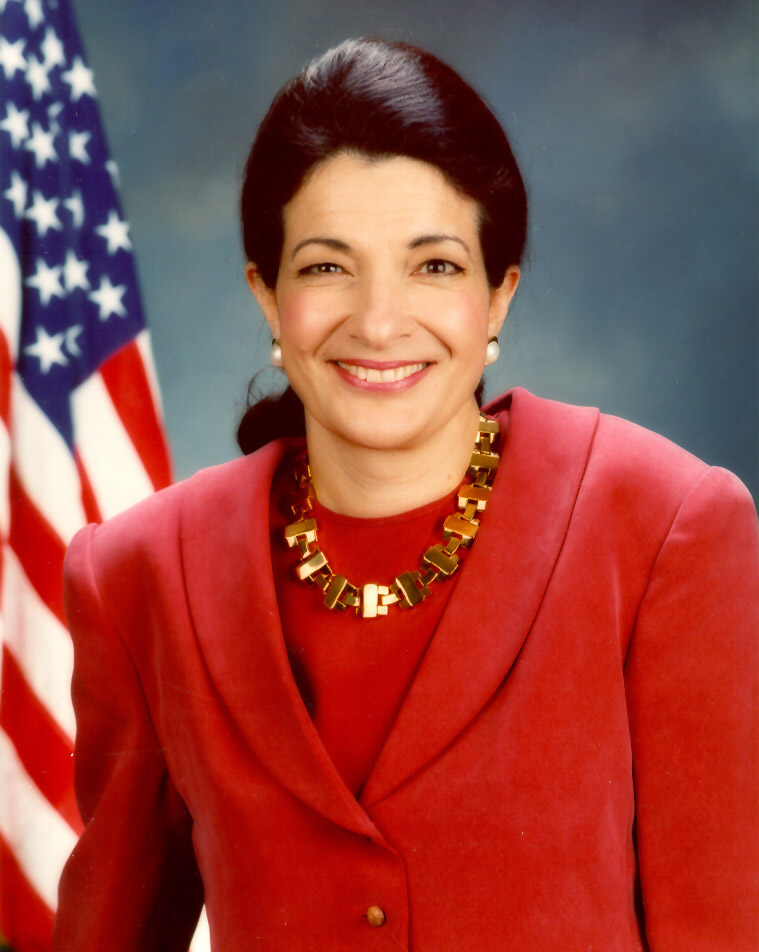
Olympia Snowe

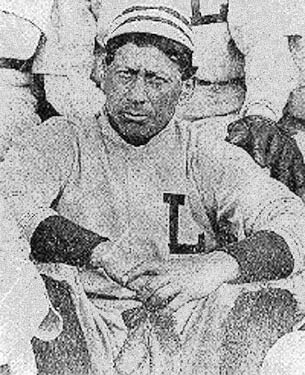
Louis Sockalexis

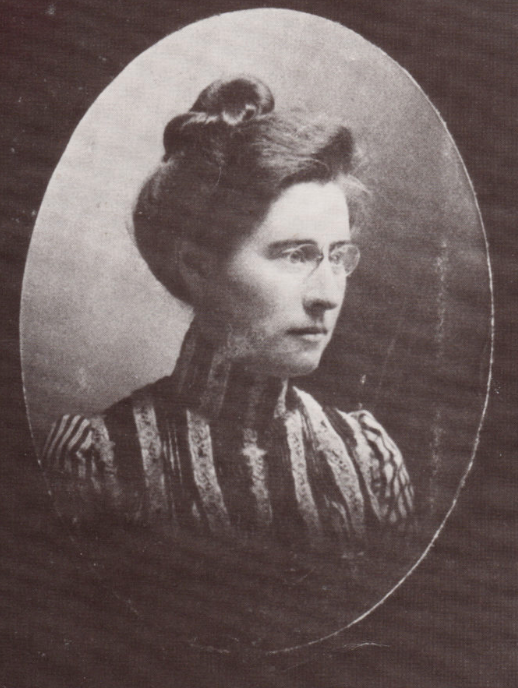
Cordelia Stanwood

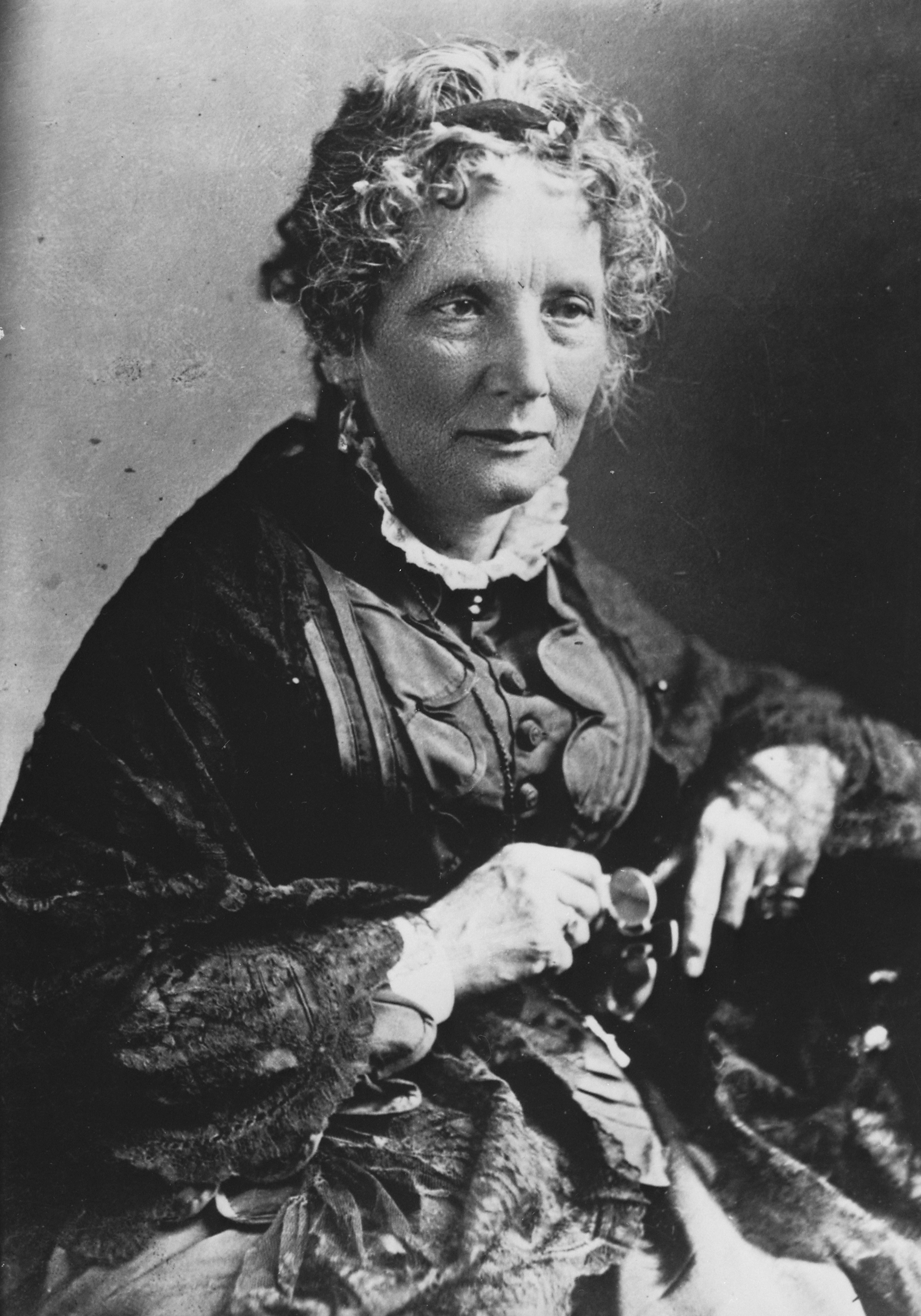
Harriet Beecher Stowe

- Tim Sample (born 1951), humorist and author; born in Fort Fairfield and raised in Boothbay Harbor
- Heather Sanborn, attorney, businesswoman, Maine Public Advocate, and Maine State Senator; grew up in and lives in Portland
- Sue A. Sanders (1842–1931), teacher, clubwoman, author; born in Casco
- Salome Sellers (1800–1909), centenarian; born in Deer Isle
- Tony Shalhoub (born 1953), actor; attended University of Southern Maine
- Marjorie W. Sharmat (1928–2019), children's writer
- Samuel Shapiro (born 1927), State Treasurer of Maine
- Burt Shavitz (1935–2015), beekeeper and businessman co-founded the Burt's Bees personal care products company
- Reta Shaw (1912–1982), actress, The Ghost & Mrs. Muir, Mary Poppins; born in South Paris
- Arthur Shawcross (1945–2008), serial killer; born in Kittery
- Roger Sherman (1940–2024), politician; born in Hodgdon
- Timothy Simons (born 1978), actor, Veep; born in Readfield
- Mark Sisson (born 1953), blogger and co-founder of Primal Kitchen
- Albion Woodbury Small (1854–1926), sociologist and founder of first university department of sociology in United States; born in Buckfield and raised in Bangor
- Taylor Small (born 1994), politician, member of the Vermont House of Representatives (2021–present); born in Portland
- Margaret Chase Smith (1897–1995), first woman to serve in both houses of U.S. Congress (1940–1973); first woman to have her name placed in nomination for the presidency at a major political party's convention; born in Skowhegan
- George Otis Smith (1871–1944), geologist; born in Hodgdon, died in Portland
- Samantha Smith (1972–1985), child peace activist, child actress; born in Houlton, later lived in Manchester
- Kate Snow (born 1969), television journalist for NBC News; born in Bangor
- Olympia Snowe (born 1947), congresswoman and U.S. senator; born in Augusta and raised in Auburn
- Louis Sockalexis (1871–1931), professional baseball player; born on Penobscot Indian Island Reservation
- Brett Somers (1922–2007), actress; born in Canada and raised in Portland
- Silas Soule (1838–1865), Union Army officer and hero for refusing to participate in the Sand Creek Massacre; born in Bath
- Susan Marr Spalding (1841–1908), poet; born in Bath
- Aly Spaltro (born 1989), musician known professionally as Lady Lamb; began her recording career in Brunswick
- Ellis Spear (1834–1917), Civil War lieutenant colonel of the 20th Maine Infantry Regiment
- Percy Spencer (1894–1970), inventor of the microwave oven; born in Howland
- Spose (born 1985), rapper, podcaster; lives in Wells
- Andrew St. John (born 1982), actor, General Hospital, Life Is Wild; born in Millinocket
- Bob Stanley (born 1954), former professional baseball player; born in Portland
- Cordelia Stanwood (1865–1968), teacher, ornithologist, and wildlife photographer; born in Ellsworth
- Tim Stauffer (born 1982), former professional baseball player; born in Portland
- C. A. Stephens (1844–1931), writer and gerontologist; born and died in Norway
- C. J. Stevens (1927–2021), author; born in Smithfield and has lived in Phillips, Weld, and Temple
- Trey Stewart (born 1994) , Minority Leader of the Maine Senate
- Harriet Beecher Stowe (1811–1896), author of Uncle Tom's Cabin; lived in Brunswick
- Noel Paul Stookey (born 1937); folk singer and songwriter; member of Peter Paul and Mary group; resides in Blue Hill
- Ethan Strimling (born 1967), 88th Mayor of Portland, Maine
- James Sullivan (1744–1808), seventh governor of Massachusetts; born and raised in Berwick
- Charlie Summers (born 1956); politician, secretary of state of Maine (2011–2013); lives in Biddeford
- Gregory Swallow, state legislator; lives in Houlton
- Bill Swift (born 1961), former professional baseball player; born in Portland
- Tim Sylvia (born 1976), mixed martial arts fighter, professional wrestler; born in Ellsworth

== T ==
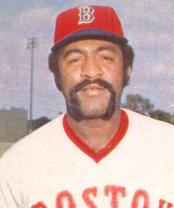
Luis Tiant

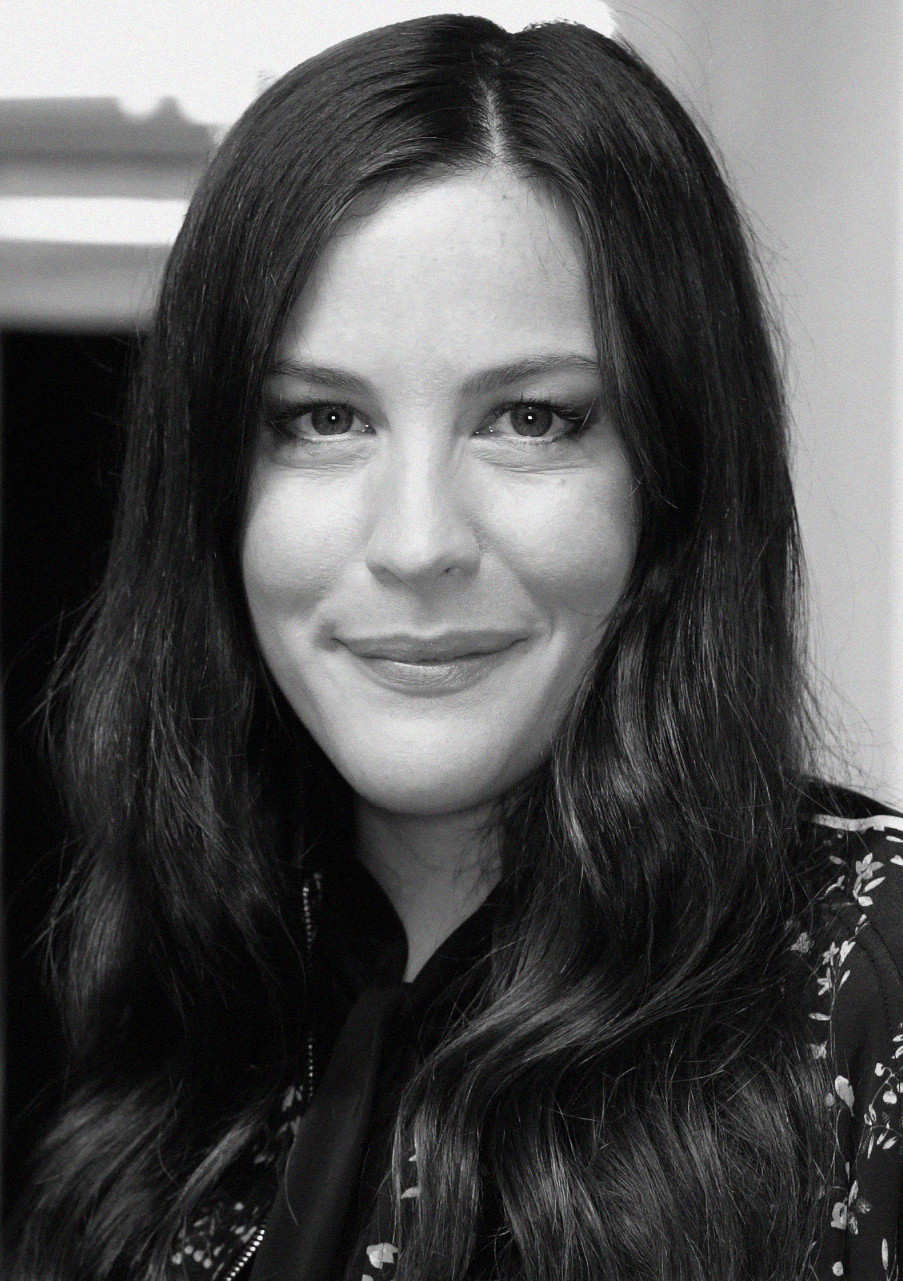
Liv Tyler

- Drew Taggart (born 1989), musician, DJ, singer of the Chainsmokers; grew up in Freeport
- Gerald Talbot (1931–2026), Maine state legislator (1972–1978), African American civil rights activist; born in Bangor
- Phyllis Thaxter (1919–2012), actress; born in Portland
- Augustin Thompson (1835–1903), creator of Moxie; born in Union
- Brigadier Samuel Thompson (1734–1798), soldier of the American Revolutionary War; lived in Brunswick
- Gary Thorne (born 1948), sportscaster; born in Bangor
- Luis Tiant (1940–2024), professional baseball player; lived in Wells
- Andrew J. Tozier (1838–1910), soldier, Congressional Medal of Honor recipient; born in Litchfield
- Novella Jewell Trott (1846–1929), author, editor; born in Woolwich
- Jeff Turner (born 1962), retired professional basketball player; born in Bangor
- Liv Tyler (born 1977), actress, daughter of Aerosmith singer Steven Tyler; grew up in Maine

== U ==
- John G. Utterback (1872–1955), politician, congressman (1933–1935); lived in Bangor

== V ==
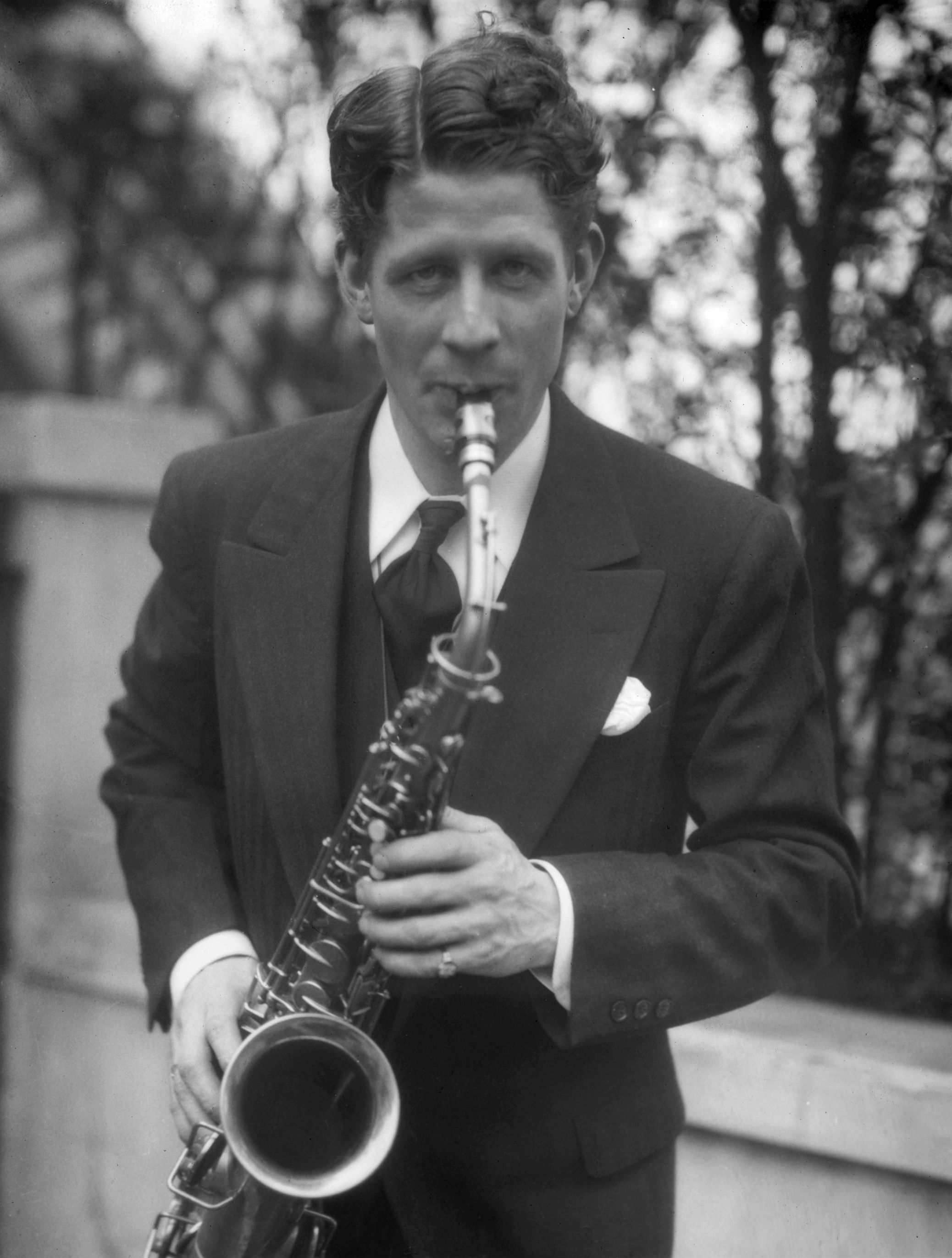
Rudy Vallée

- Donald Valle (1908–1977), founder and owner of Valle's Steak House restaurant chain; born in Italy, moved to Portland in 1912
- Richard Valle (1931–1995), son of Donald Valle and owner of eponymously named Valle's Steak House; born in Portland
- Rudy Vallée (1901–1986), singer, actor, bandleader, and entertainer; lived in Westbrook
- Todd Verow (born 1966), filmmaker, cinematographer, actor; born in Bangor
- Cynthia Voigt (born 1942), author; lives in Deer Isle.

== W ==
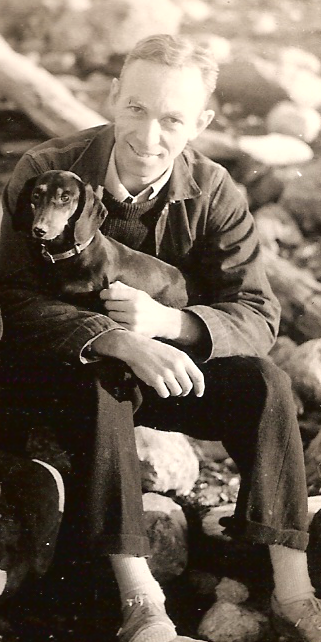
E. B. White

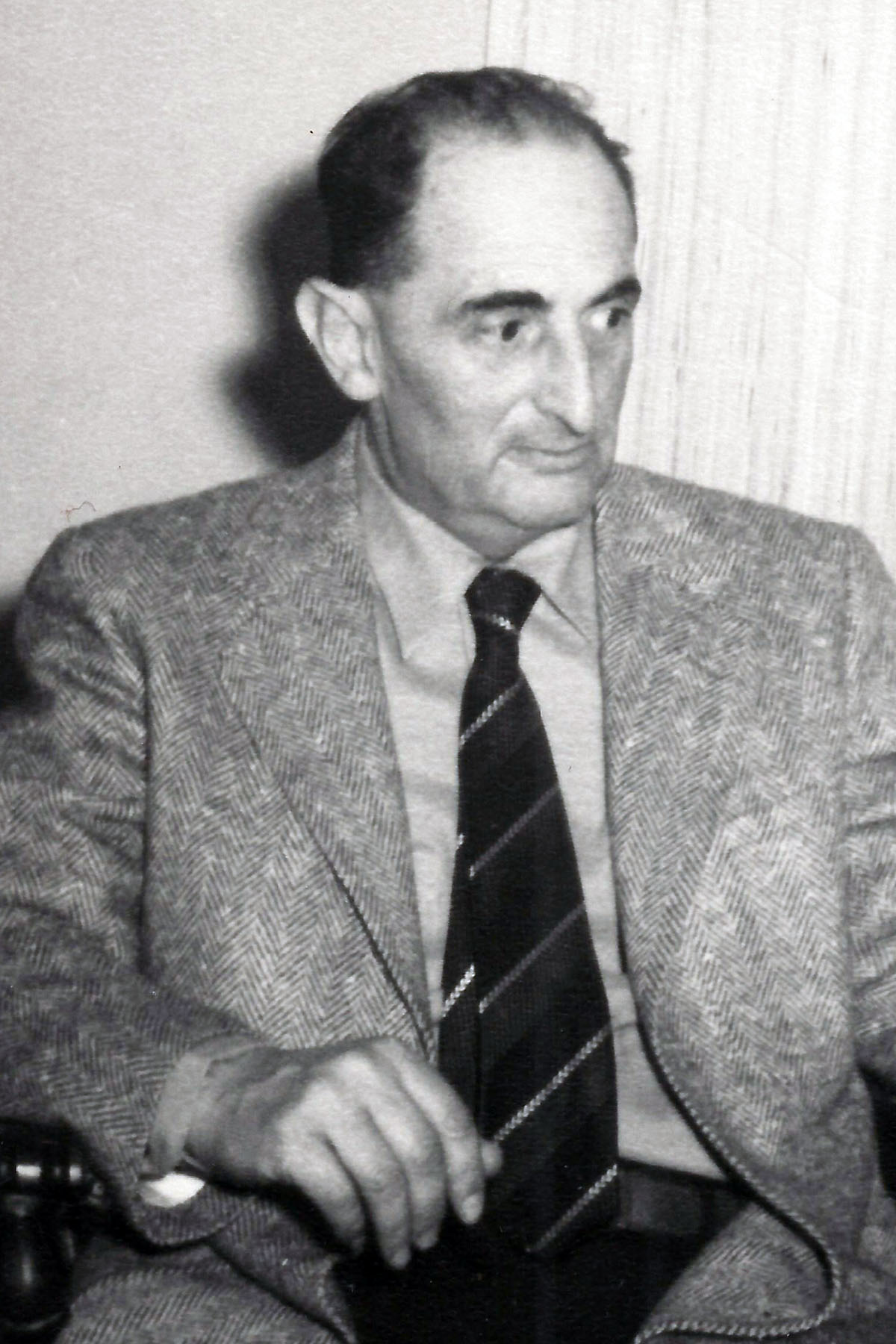
Henry Winterfeld

- Oliver Wahlstrom (born 2000), professional hockey player; born in Yarmouth
- John Bruce Wallace (born 1950), composer, musician, author; born in Calais
- Dan Walters (1966–2020), baseball player; born in Brunswick
- Sam Webb (born 1945), former chairman of Communist Party USA; born in Maine
- Janwillem van de Wetering (1931–2008), novelist; lived in Blue Hill
- Clarence White (1944–1973), bluegrass, country rock, and rock guitarist; born in Lewiston
- E. B. White (1899–1985), essayist, author, humorist, poet; lived in Brooklin
- Ellen G. White (1827–1915), author, co-founder of the Seventh-day Adventist Church; born in Gorham
- Charles Whitman (1842–1910), zoologist, influential to the founding of classical ethology; born in Woodstock
- Danny Wilde (born 1956), guitarist, singer, and founding member of pop group The Rembrandts; born in Houlton
- JoAnn Willette (born 1963), actress, Just the Ten of Us; born in Lewiston
- Carl Willey (1931–2009), professional baseball player; born in Cherryfield
- William D. Williamson (1779–1846), politician, governor of Maine (1821); lived in Bangor
- Dorothy Clarke Wilson (1904–2003), author, playwright; born in Gardiner
- Sarah Wilson (died 1780), thief and convict; died in Berwick
- Henry Winterfeld (1901–1990), refugee from Nazi Germany, published under the pseudonym Manfred Michael, writer and artist, known for his children's and young adult novels
- Bob Woolf (1928–1993), sports agent and lawyer
- Abba Goold Woolson (1838–1921), writer; born in Windham
- Andrew Wyeth (1917–2009), 20th-century painter; had a home in Cushing
- Jamie Wyeth (born 1946), contemporary painter; lives in Monhegan
- N. C. Wyeth (1882–1945), artist and illustrator; bought a home in Port Clyde in the 1930s
- Nick Wyman (born 1950), actor, Die Hard with a Vengeance; born in Portland

== Z ==
- Steven Zirnkilton (born 1958), voice actor and former politician; lives in Seal Harbor

== See also ==
- List of Maine suffragists
- Lists of Americans
