= Hermitage of Sant'Angelo =

Hermitage of Sant'Angelo may refer to:

- Hermitage of Sant'Angelo in Lettomanoppello
- Hermitage of Sant'Angelo in Palombaro
