= De Cecco =

Italian food company

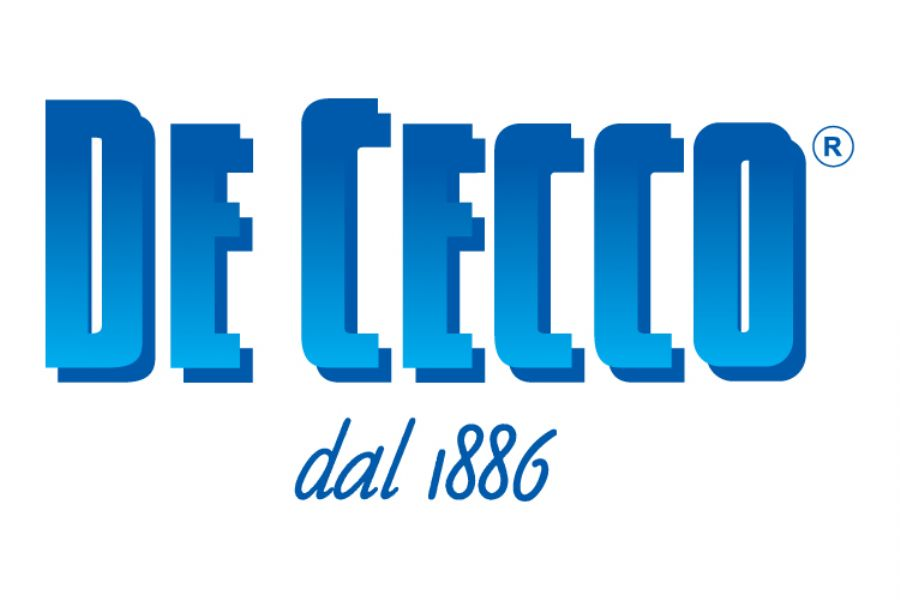
- Industry: Food
- Founded: 1886; 140 years ago
- Headquarters: Fara San Martino, Abruzzo, Italy
- Products: Pasta; Olive oil; Tomato products; Sauces; Vinegar

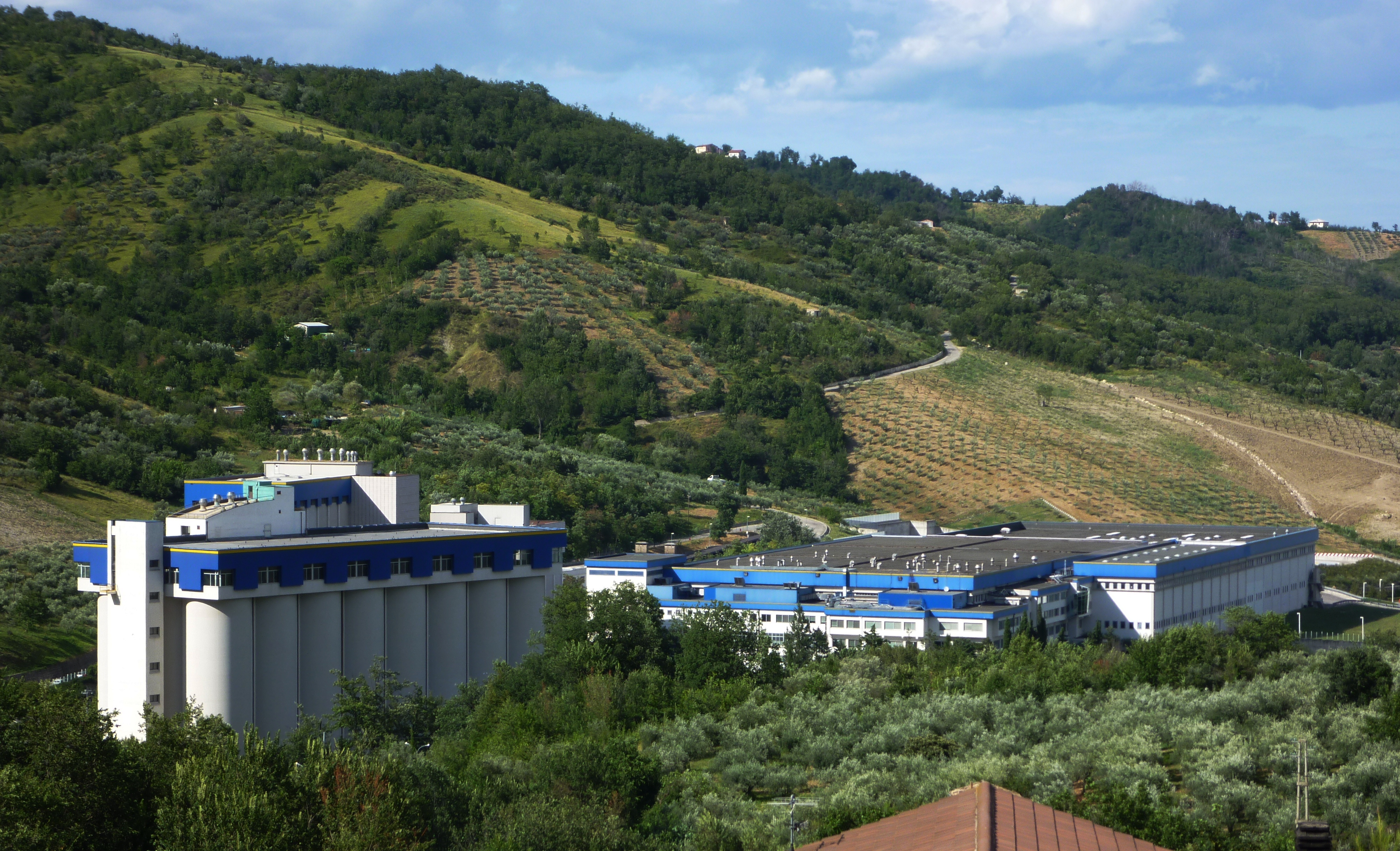
De Cecco factory in Fara San Martino

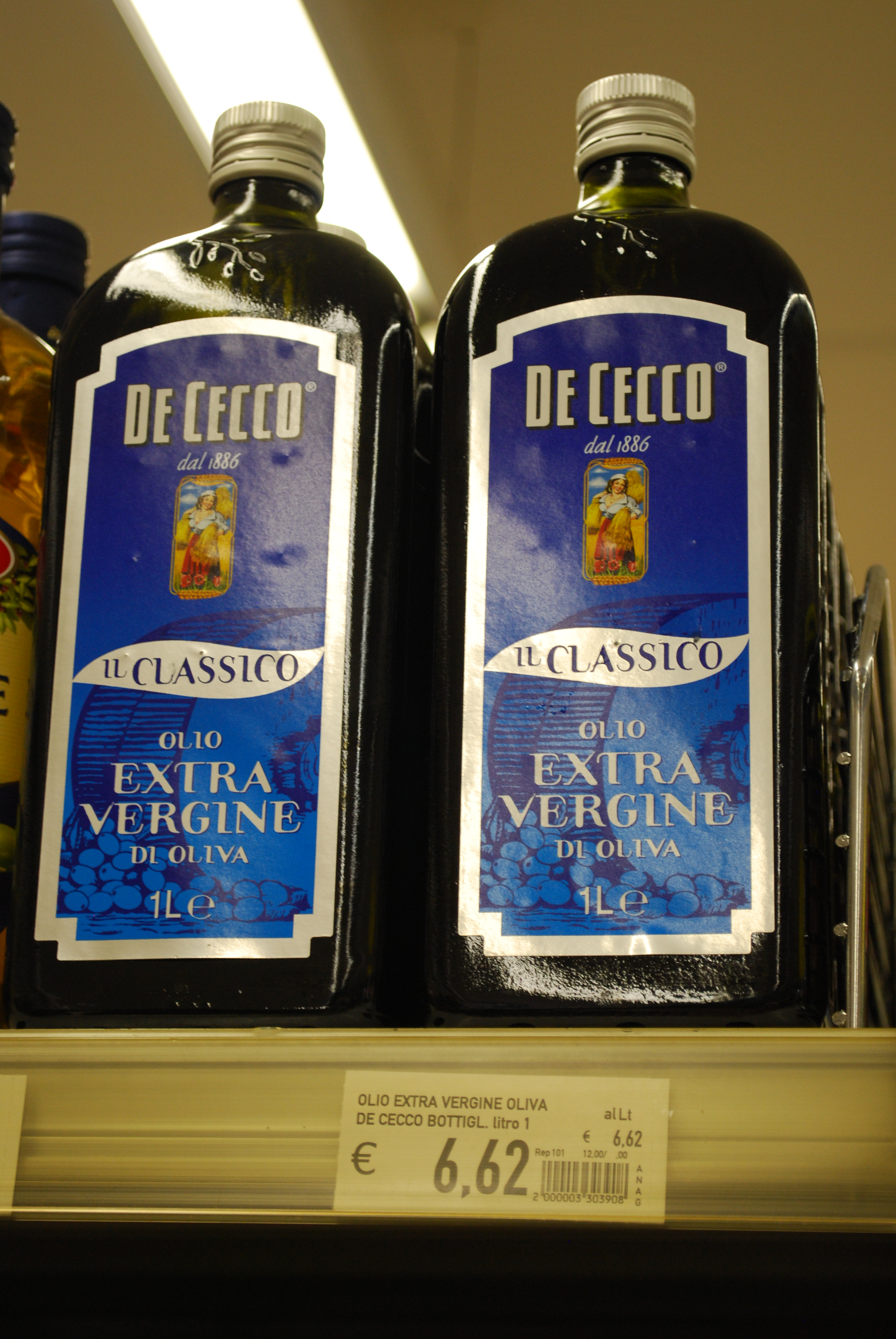
De Cecco extra virgin olive oil

De Cecco (pronounced [de ˈtʃekko]) is an Italian company producing dried pasta, flour and other related food products. It is the third-largest manufacturer of pasta in the world.

== History ==
The company was founded in 1886 by the De Cecco brothers in the small town of Fara San Martino in the Abruzzo region of central Italy. Nicola De Cecco originally produced flour at his stone mill before establishing the pasta factory.

In 1908, the company adopted a country girl carrying two wheat sheaves as its trademark. After World War II, the factory was rebuilt after being destroyed by German bomb attacks. In 1950, De Cecco completed a new factory in Pescara to meet the increased demand that occurred after the war. In 1980, a new production facility was opened in Fara San Martino, doubling the company's production output. In 1986 the company began to diversify its offerings by establishing its olive oil brand. De Cecco offerings have since expanded to sauces, grains and tomato-based products.

=== Modern ===
As of 2013, De Cecco is the third-largest pasta producer in the world.

Turnover reached 447.5 million euros in 2016, up by 5.7%, with EBITDA increased by 18% to 49 million euros and gross profit of 19% to 56 million euros. The 24 shareholders of the parent company span the third to the fifth De Cecco generations, divided among three family branches. At the April meeting, the go-ahead was given to a plan to float on the stock exchange. This plan reorganized the group with the entry of external managers, in particular a CEO, also in view of an expansion in the USA. As early as 2007, listing on a stock exchange was considered, a plan then frozen by the economic crisis of 2008. In March 2018, after closing 2017 with 436 million euros in revenues and an Ebitda of 50 million, the company approved a change of governance. In June 2018, leadership was entrusted for the first time to an external manager, Francesco Fattori (formerly of Findus Italia), who remained in office only until 3 May 2019, when the owners removed him from office due to disputes over mandated obligations.

The company continued its sales and operations in Russia after the Russian invasion of Ukraine in 2022. They reported that it generated over 35 million euros in revenue in Russia.

In June 2026, De Cecco signed a binding agreement to acquire a 100% stake in RossoGargano.

== See also ==
- List of Italian companies
