= Hanover Trail =

Defunct American steakhouse chain

Hanover Trail Steak House
- Industry: Restaurant
- Founded: 1973 in Whippany, New Jersey
- Fate: Defunct
- Number of locations: 14
- Area served: Mid-Atlantic, U.S.
- Owner: Campbell Soup Company

Hanover Trail was an American steakhouse chain launched by Campbell's.

During the early 1970s, Campbell Soup Company began exploring new products and ventures, including restaurants. In 1970, the company acquired the Pacific Northwest fast food restaurant, and expanded it from 11 locations to 52 by 1972. Campbell's then decided to enter the steakhouse field, opening its first Hanover Trail Steak House in Whippany, New Jersey in 1973. It had a Western theme modeled after Hilltop Steak House. It described by Jean Hewitt as a "place to take large appetites and the kids and not worry about dressing up or blowing the week's paycheck" and by Frank J. Prial as "near the top among the various chains of steak houses cropping up these days - not only in quality, but also in price.

The Whippany restaurant drew 600,000 diners in its first year and by May 1974, Campbell's had begun construction on Woodbridge Township, New Jersey and Ramsey, New Jersey locations. At its peak, the chain had 14 locations. In 1978, Hanover Trail dropped steak house from its name to reflect changing consumer preferences amid rising beef prices. In 1981, Campbell's launched a new chain of restaurants known as H. T. McDoogal's and planned to convert Hanover Trail to the new concept. By 1985, Campbell's had converted the Ramsey, Deptford Township, New Jersey, and Greenbelt, Maryland locations to H. T. McDoogal's restaurants and only one Hanover Trail, located in Harrisburg, Pennsylvania, remained.
