= Delverde =

Italian food company

Delverde Industrie Alimentari SpA
- Industry: Food
- Founded: 1967; 59 years ago
- Headquarters: Fara San Martino, Italy
- Area served: Worldwide
- Products: Pasta; Pasta sauce; Pesto
- Website: www.delverde.com

Delverde Industrie Alimentari SpA is an Italian food company manufacturing pasta, pasta sauces, and pesto. Based in Fara San Martino, the company exports its products to over 65 countries worldwide. Its main production site is located at Majella National Park, and the company derived its name from the Verde river which originates near the factory.

== History ==
Delverde was founded in 1967. In 2010, the company was acquired by the Argentine food company Molinos Rio de la Plata. Delverde's worldwide revenue in 2011 stood at around $43 million, with its largest market being Italy, followed by Canada and the United States. In 2019, the company was acquired again by Newlat Food S.p.A., an Italian food corporation.
