= Donald Valle =

American restaurateur

- American restaurateur
- Born: 1908; Lettomanoppello, Italy
- Died: September 17, 1977 (aged 68–69); Newton, United States
- Occupations: Founder and President of Valle's Steak House

Donald Valle (1908 – September 17, 1977) was an American restaurateur who founded, owned, and managed the Valle's Steak House from 1933 until his death in 1977.

== Early years ==
Valle was born in Lettomanoppello, Italy, in 1908 and immigrated to the United States from Italy in 1912. His family settled in Portland, Maine. A year after their move, Valle's father was killed working on a road construction project in Maine.

As a young man, Valle delivered newspapers and shined shoes after school. A local attorney, impressed with his work ethic, paid for Valle's attendance at the Hebron Academy, where Valle starred as halfback on the school's football team. Valle graduated from high school in 1927.

After leaving school, Valle worked in the insurance business and although he was successful, was more interested in starting his own business. His opportunity arose when Franklin Delano Roosevelt became president and repealed Prohibition. In 1933, Valle purchased a small 12-seat café in Portland's Woodfords Corner that had obtained a beer and wine license. Valle quickly built up a clientele and earned enough money to expand. His ability to sell reasonably priced steak dinners in his café convinced him to open a full-service restaurant in Portland, not far from his café. Valle's business philosophy was to sell high-quality dinners to the average person.

"I was convinced that by keeping the margin of profit down, I could make up the difference by volume business. I knew the public still liked a good meal at a fair price and that's what I tried to offer."

Valle's continued success allowed him to purchase a nightclub in Scarborough, Maine, in 1936 and convert that into his second restaurant.

== Valle's Steak House Chain ==
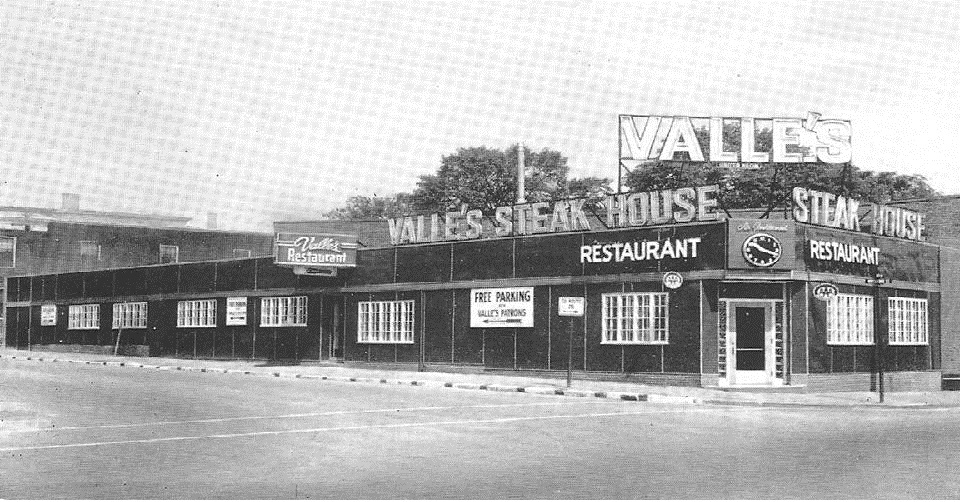
After operating a small cafe, Donald Valle purchased a larger restaurant in the Woodfords Corner neighborhood of Portland, Maine, and named it "Valle's Steak House"

In 1950, Valle built his first custom steak house in Kittery, Maine. Subsequently, he began expanding beyond Maine and opened additional restaurants in New England. In 1968 the company went public and its shares were listed on the American Stock Exchange. By 1969 Valle was buying $4,000,000 worth of beef and lobsters and was serving over 200,000 people a week. The restaurant chain employed 1,300 people and had also created and issued over 6,000 of its own credit cards. Valle continued expanding the company south to Florida during the 1970s with the intent to eventually expand throughout the United States and open restaurants on the West Coast. The success of the company attracted a buyout offer from Campbell Soup Company in 1970. At the time of the offer, Valle was operating 12 restaurants in Maine, Massachusetts, Rhode Island, Connecticut, and New York and had five additional restaurants being developed. Campbell offered to purchase all of the company's assets and assume its liabilities for $38,900,000. Negotiations collapsed, however, as Valle was not satisfied with the level of control that Campbell was planning to exercise over the company after the merger.

Valle had a reputation as a tireless worker and expected the same level of effort from his employees. Once, when taking a group of restaurant owners through one of his steak houses, Valle pointed out how trim his workers were because they stayed so busy. When one of the visitors pointed to a heavy set employee, Valle said "He's new. Come back in a couple of months and you will see he's slimmed down." At the time of his death in 1977, the company had expanded to 25 locations, all of which were located on the East Coast.

Valle's son, Richard, assumed and maintained control of the company until 1982 when he and other Valle family members sold their controlling shares to a group of non-family investors. Among the reasons for the sale was the inability of the Valle family to pay the required estate taxes that followed the death of Donald Valle. The company struggled to maintain profitability during the 1980s and began selling off its properties. The last Valle's Steak House, located in Portland, closed in August 2000.

== Death ==
Valle died of a heart attack at Newton-Wellesley Hospital on September 17, 1977, aged 68-69. At the time of his death, Valle was living in North Miami, Florida, and was on a business trip in the Boston area.

== See also ==
- List of American restaurateurs
