= Hermitage of Sant'Angelo, Palombaro =

Hermitage in Palombaro, Abruzzo, Italy

Hermitage of Sant'Angelo
- Eremo di Sant'Angelo
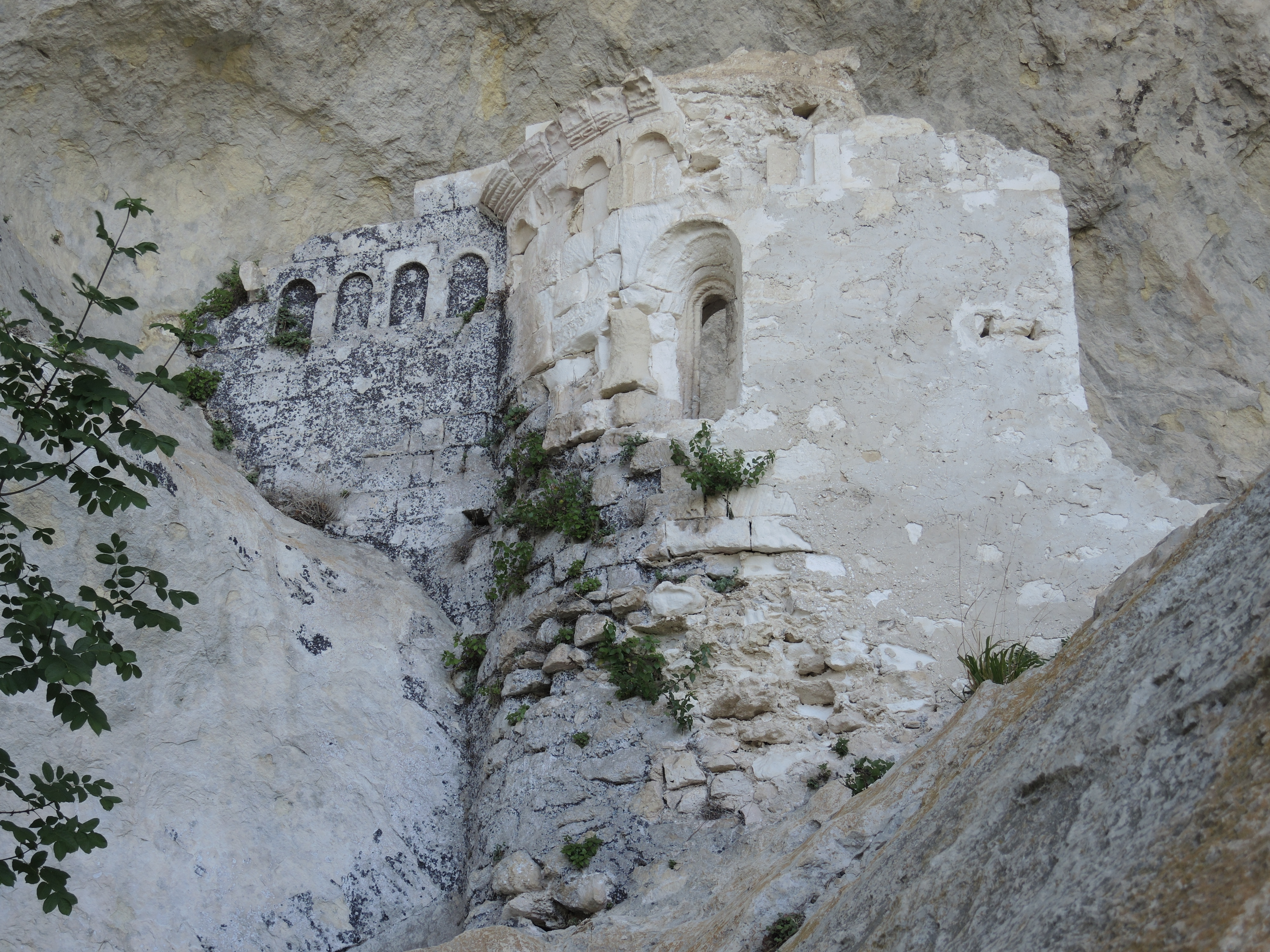
- View of the hermitage

- Location within Abruzzo

Religion
- Affiliation: Roman Catholic
- Province: Province of Chieti
- Region: Abruzzo

Location
- Municipality: Palombaro
- State: Italy
- Interactive map of Hermitage of Sant'Angelo

Architecture
- Groundbreaking: 11th century

Eremo di Sant'Angelo (Italian for Hermitage of Sant'Angelo) is an hermitage located in Palombaro, Province of Chieti (Abruzzo, Italy).

== History ==
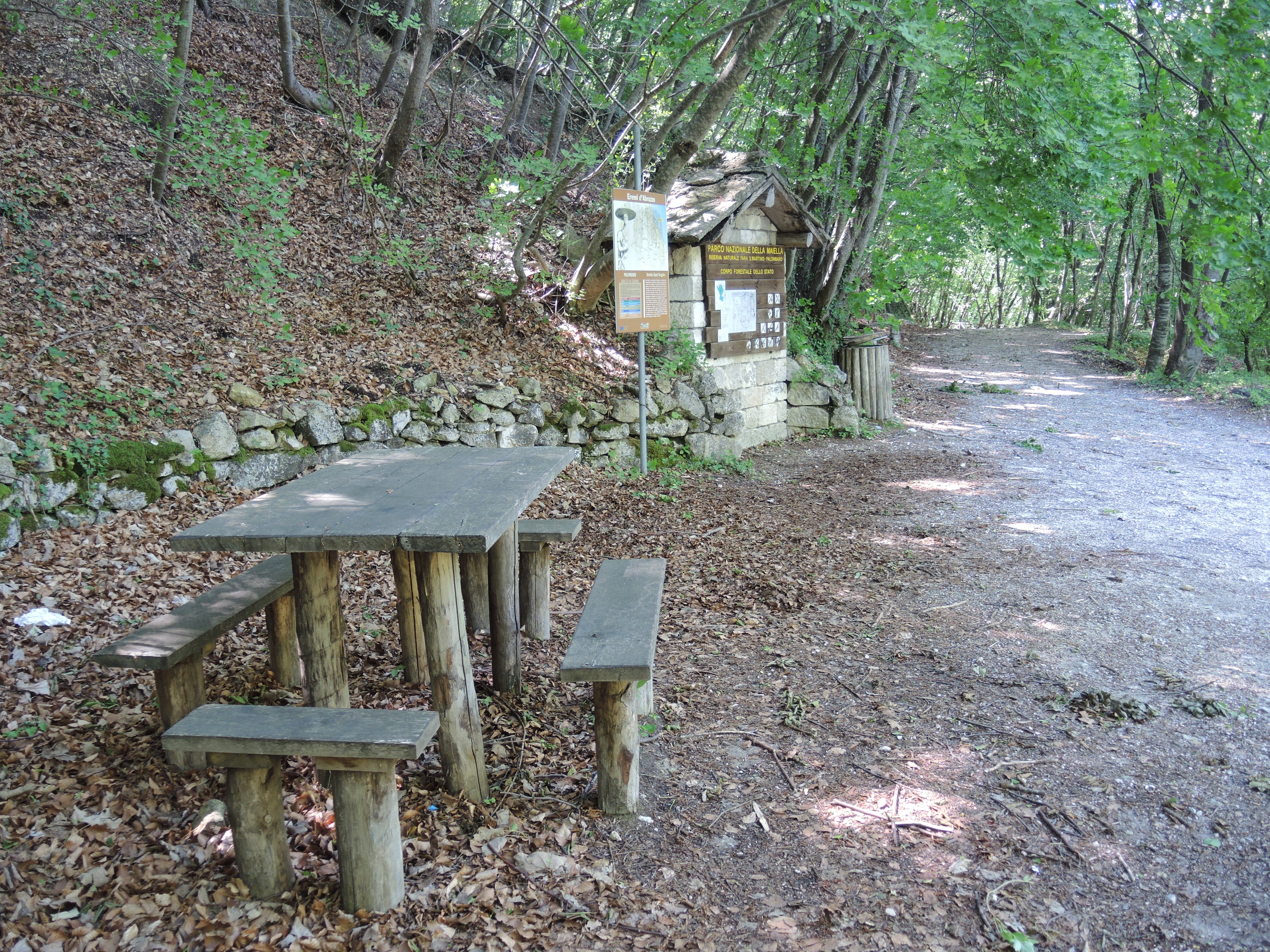
Equipped area

There is no definite information on the construction date of the hermitage, which is believed to date back to the 11th century and, according to tradition, was built on the remains of a sanctuary dedicated to Bona, the goddess of fertility.

The first historical reference to the church dates back to 1221, with a bull issued by Pope Honorius III confirming the churches of S. Angelo and S. Flaviano "in castro PALUMBANI" to the Abbey of San Martino in Valle.

== Architecture ==
The cave consists of a rectangular shelter under the rock, about 35 meters wide. On the left side is an oblique rock, on which rests a structure composed of two walls connected by a semicircular apse, which are the remains of the medieval church. The inner part of the cave comprises irregular steps with the remains of numerous cisterns for collecting rainwater.

The walls and the apse are decorated with a row of hanging arches. The apse is adorned with a frame featuring twisted cord decorations that are also found in the splayed window of the apse, presumably made by the same craftsmen who worked on the Abbey of San Liberatore a Majella.

The cave is easily reachable with about a 15-minute walk from the equipped area located in the hamlet of Sant'Agata d'Ugno (42.126740°N 14.202966°E). The path is protected by a fence along the cliff, and the steeper points are equipped with steps.
