= Lettomanoppello =

- Comune
- Comune di Lettomanoppello
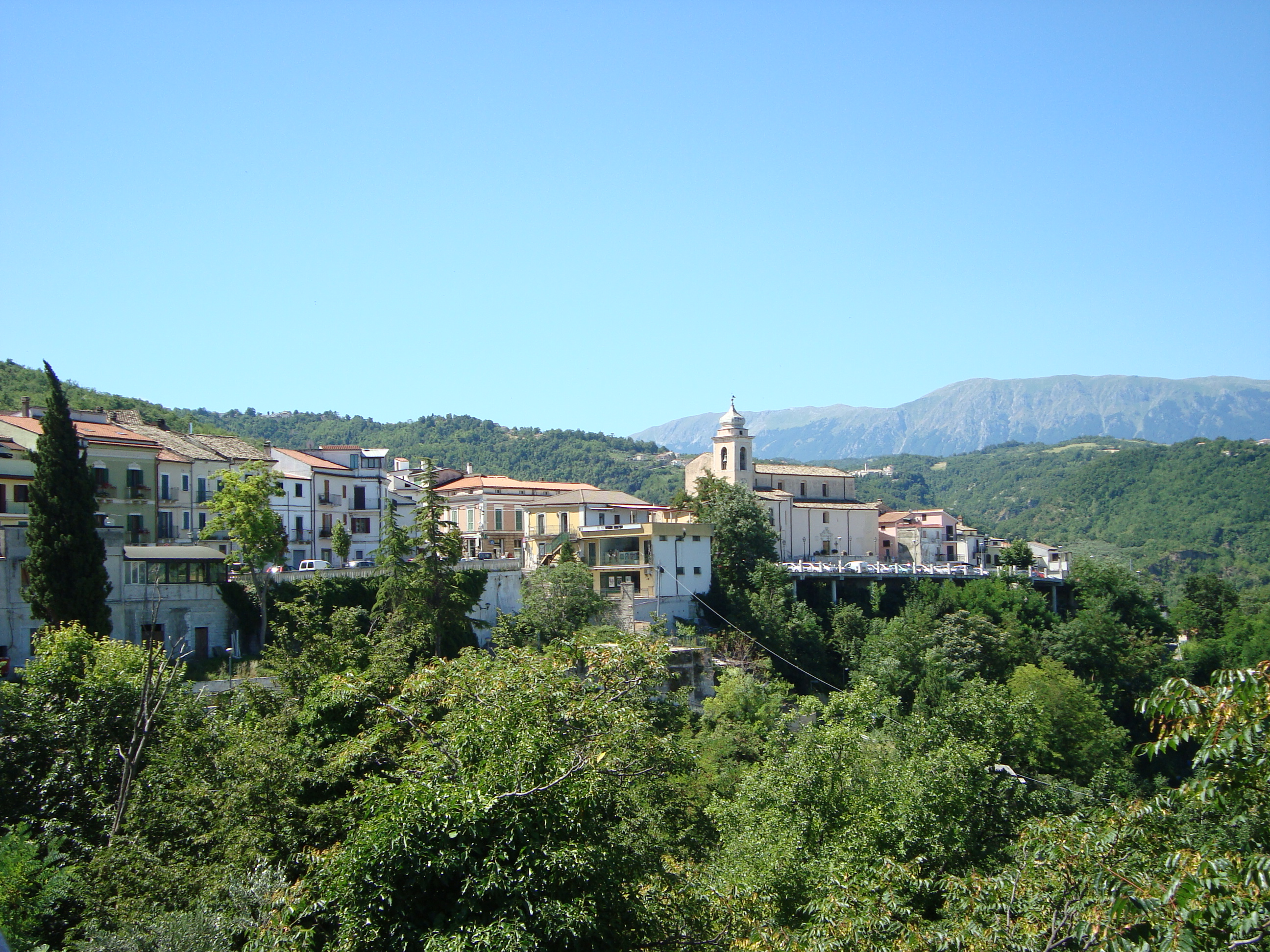
- View of Lettomanoppello

- Location within Italy Location within Abruzzo
- Coordinates: 42°14′N 14°2′E
- Country: Italy
- Region: Abruzzo
- Province: Pescara (PE)
- Frazioni: Canale Calvario, Lavino Chiuse

Government
  - Mayor: Simone Romano D'Alfonso

Area
  - Total: 15.07 km^{2} (5.82 sq mi)
- Elevation: 370 m (1,210 ft)

Population (1 January 2026)
  - Total: 2,603
  - Density: 172.7/km^{2} (447.4/sq mi)
- Demonym: Lettesi
- Time zone: UTC+1 (CET)
  - Summer (DST): UTC+2 (CEST)
- Postal code: 65020
- Dialing code: 085
- Patron saint: St. Nicholas of Bari
- Saint day: 6 December
- Website: Official website

Lettomanoppello (Abruzzese: Lu L'lètt) is a town and comune in province of Pescara, Abruzzo, central Italy. In Roman times the area was known for its asphalt mines and later for a white stone that could be carved.

== Geography ==
The town is situated near the Majella National Park, about 30 minutes away from the city of Pescara. The mountainous region offers sightseeing in the wilderness or on its highest peaks. The elevation stretches from about 300 metres (980 ft) above sea level and a road leads right up the top, at 2,100 metres (6,900 ft). During winter it becomes a spot for skiing and winter sports in the mountains.

The town is commonly called "Lu Lette" and the mountain passages are commonly called "Passe Lanciano" by locals.

== History ==
The history of the current town dates back to the 11th century but was certainly occupied earlier by Romans, who excavated asphalt in the area. It is also quarried for its white stone and marble.

== Notable people ==
- Donald Valle (1908-1977) American businessman and owner of the eponymously named Valle's Steak House.

== See also ==
- Hermitage of Sant'Angelo
