= Hilltop Steak House =

American restaurant chain, 1961–2013

Hilltop Steakhouse
- Founded: 1961
- Founder: Frank Giuffrida
- Defunct: 2013
- Number of locations: 5 (1992); 1 (2013)
- Area served: Massachusetts; Connecticut; New Hampshire

The Hilltop Steak House was an American restaurant located on Route 1 in Saugus, Massachusetts. Founded in 1961 by Frank Giuffrida, it was one of the busiest restaurants in the United States during the 1970s, 1980s, and 1990s. The Hilltop closed in 2013.

== Restaurant under Giuffrida ==
In 1961, Giuffrida, a 43 year old butcher from Lawrence, Massachusetts, purchased a small bar on busy Route 1 in Saugus for $7,000 and converted it into a 125-seat steakhouse. The restaurant soon drew large crowds, which required an expansion to 400 seats. A third expansion later brought the restaurant's capacity up to 1,500 seats. Giuffrida also added a butcher shop to the rear of the restaurant. The Hilltop was known for its decorations outside including a 68-foot-high neon cactus and full-sized plastic cows. The Boston Globe’s Anthony Spinazzola described the Hilltop's interior decor as "old ranch modern with wooden Indians, stone fireplaces, buffalo heads, Victorian lighting fixtures, plastic flowers and color that runs to expected browns and reds". The restaurant featured five dining rooms and a cocktail lounge named after Wild West cities (Dodge City, Kansas City, Sioux City, Carson City, Santa Fe, and Virginia City). Until the 1990s the restaurant did not take reservations or accept credit cards.

In the 1970s, the Campbell's attempted to create a chain of Hilltop-like restaurants and hired Giuffrida as a consultant. The business, known as the Hanover Trail Steak House, was unsuccessful.

In 1977, the Hilltop grossed $11 million in sales, which was described by Spinazzola as "probably the largest gross sales in a restaurant in the world”. In 1985 it grossed $24.2 million from 2.35 million diners, which placed it at the top of Restaurants & Institutions‘s list of highest-volume restaurants. Hilltop again topped Restaurants & Institutions’s list for 1986 with an estimated $26.9 million in sales. The New York Times described the Hilltop as "America's largest restaurant, both in number of customers served and sales volume" in 1987. At that time, the Hilltop served nearly 2.4 million customers annually, three times the volume of the nation's second-largest restaurant, Tavern on the Green in Manhattan. That year they exceeded $27 million gross. In 1988, it produced an estimated $31.5 million in sales and was again cited by Restaurants & Institutions as the largest-grossing restaurant in the United States. In June 1989 the Hilltop projected $25 million in sales for that year. In 1990, the Hilltop again topped Restaurants & Institutions’ list of top-grossing restaurants with an estimated $27.3 million in sales. In 1991, Tavern on the Green replaced the Hilltop as the highest grossing independent restaurant in the United States.

== Sale and expansion attempt ==
In 1988, Giuffrida sold the corporation that owned and operated Hilltop Steak House to John Swansburg. Giuffrida, however, retained ownership of the land and the building and leased it to the corporation. Soon thereafter, Hilltop announced plans to expand the restaurant into a national chain. In 1989, Hilltop opened a second location in Nashua, New Hampshire. In 1990, Hilltop Steak House Inc. took over the lease of Le Biftheque, a steakhouse that was located in the former Valle's Steak House property in Braintree, Massachusetts. In 1992, Hilltop Steak House Inc. filed a registration statement with the Securities Exchange Commission for an initial public offering. By this time, Hilltop had opened a fourth location in Springfield, Massachusetts. The IPO was canceled two months later after the company was unable to draw the prices it wanted for its shares. In August 1992, Hilltop's fifth location was opened at the former Valle's in Hartford, Connecticut. The Hartford location closed after a little over one year in business. The Springfield location closed by 1995; the Nashua location did so in 1997. In 2006, Hilltop sold its Braintree location to Tufankjian Toyota. Hilltop moved its Braintree butcher shop to Weymouth, Massachusetts the following year, but did not reopen the restaurant. In 2013, two longtime Hilltop employees took over the butcher shop and continued to run it until 2015.

== Menu ==
Hilltop's early menu was small and focused on beef and a few other meat options as well as lobster pie and a few appetizers, desserts, and kids meals. Most meals came with a potato or vegetable, rolls and butter, and a salad. The salad had only one dressing option - the house oil and vinegar. By the 1980s the menu had expanded to include more chicken and fish options as well as a bevy of side dishes. During successful years, the Hilltop was known for large portions of high-quality food at low prices. In 2006 Zagat rated Hilltop's food as poor to fair. It was the only restaurant north of Boston to receive Zagat's lowest rating for quality of food.

== Cactus sign ==
In 1966, Giuffrida hired Mack Advertising Inc., an electric sign company that specialized in the use of neon and plastic signs, to make a new sign for the restaurant. Giuffrida and Mack principal Charles S. Magliozzi considered many Western designs, including cowboys and cattle, before settling on the cactus. A hole eight feet deep, 28 feet long, and 15 feet wide was blasted for the base of the sign. It took six flatbed trailers to haul all of the parts. The 67-foot sign, which contains 210 fluorescent light bulbs and nearly a half-mile of neon tubing, took five days to assemble.

== Later years ==
In 1994, Hilltop Steak House Inc. was purchased by its original supplier - High Country Investors. In 2006, an Essex County jury found that the Hilltop's function department illegally steered tip money to managers and wrongfully terminated four waitresses after they complained. According to the defendant's attorney, Shannon Liss-Riordan, the final judgement was expected to be over $2.5 million. On December 31, 2003, Giuffrida died after suffering a stroke. In 2004, High Country purchased the Hilltop from the Giuffrida family outright. Soon thereafter, the two sides went to court over privileges established in the original lease, which entitled the Giuffridas and their guests to free food and drink and access to the first available table for life, which were lost following the sale. The court found in favor of High Country Investors. In recognition of the restaurant's decline, Bill Simmons wrote an acerbic fictional story in March 2012 for his then-website Grantland which lambasted that season's Boston Celtics for their many failings via a roast of Danny Ainge at Hilltop (https://grantland.com/features/the-danny-ainge-anniversary-party/). One year later, the Hilltop Steak House closed. The property was sold and items, including the plastic cows, were auctioned off. Three of the cow statues were moved to the Market Street retail center in Lynnfield, Massachusetts.

In 2018, AvalonBay Communities redeveloped the 14 acre property into “Avalon at Hilltop" - a residential and commercial development that includes 280 luxury apartments, two restaurants, a dry cleaner, and a hair salon. Avalon incorporated Hilltop's famous cactus sign into the new project. The sign still stands today and is frequently seen on Boston TV traffic reports covering that area of Route 1.
