= Richard Valle =

American restaurateur

Richard D. Valle
- Richard Valle at the opening of the Fall River, Mass. Valle's Steak House in 1970
- Born: May 2, 1931; Portland, Maine, U.S.
- Died: July 8, 1995 (aged 64); Hyannis, Massachusetts, U.S.
- Education: University of New Hampshire School of Hotel and Restaurant Management
- Occupations: Corporate executive; Chairman and President of Valle's Steak House

Richard D. Valle (May 2, 1931 – July 8, 1995) was an American restaurateur who owned and managed the Valle's Steak House chain of restaurants from the death of his father in 1977 to when he sold his controlling shares of the company to a private investor group in 1982.

== Early years ==
Valle was born in 1931 in Portland, Maine, as the youngest of two children of Donald Valle and Sue Valle. At the time of his birth, his father was operating a Portland restaurant named "Valle's Steak House." The restaurant soon became one of the most popular restaurants on the East Coast and was described as the busiest steak house in the United States. Richard Valle's first experience in the business was working at his father's side in the Portland restaurant at the age of 11.

Richard Valle graduated from the University of New Hampshire School of Hotel and Restaurant Management. He was a flight instructor in the Air Force during the Korean War, and continued to fly his own aircraft out of the Chatham, Hyannis and Marstons Mills airports until his death.

== Career as a Valle's executive ==
Valle held a number of positions in the company and was serving as the company's vice president when his father died in 1977. He then he became the company's president and provided oversight of the company's continued expansion plans. By 1980, faced with declining sales and profits, he decided to bring the company's 12-year expansion program to a halt. At the time, the company had expanded to 32 restaurants along the East Coast. The Valle family was also saddled with an inheritance tax bill resulting from the 1977 death of Donald Valle that it was not prepared to pay.

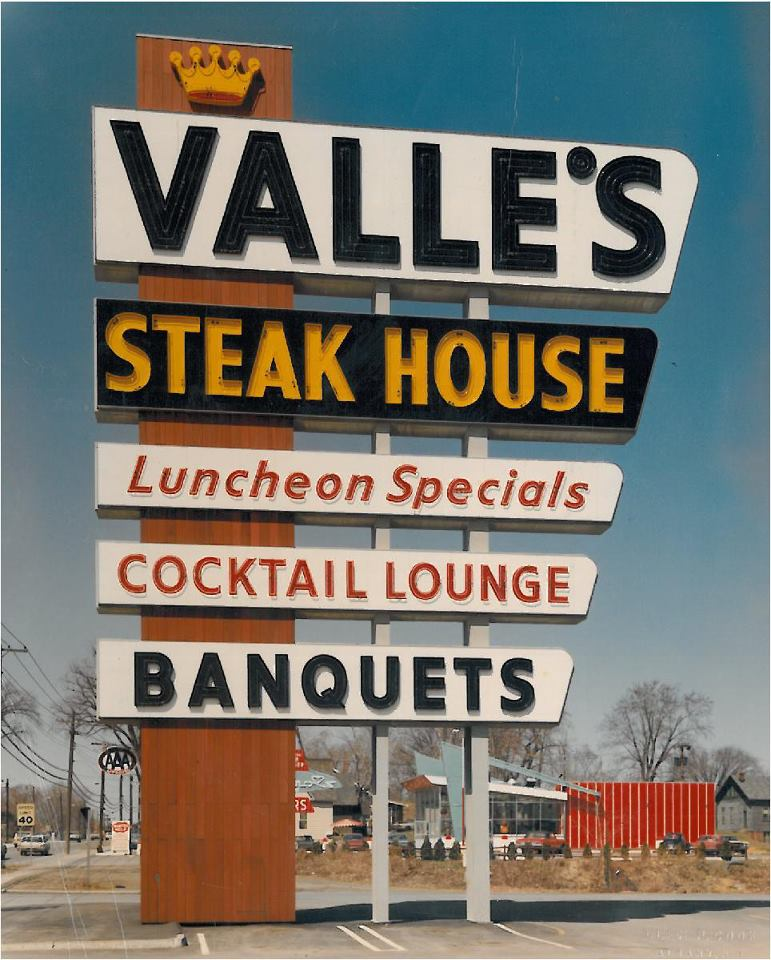
Valle's sign outside of the Albany, New York, restaurant. Photo courtesy of Saxton Signs, Castleton, New York.

In 1980, Richard Valle decided to remove himself from the day-to-day management of the company in order to focus on the company's strategic plans as the chairman. At the time, Valle had been involved in all facets of operation and had personally designed the restaurant's paper place mats, selected the earthtone decor of the firm's newest restaurants, and wrote the words to a radio advertisement jingle. Valle had also developed the concept of a smaller restaurant that would only seat 400 customers as opposed to the long-standing design that seated well over a thousand.

Valle's transition to chairman was soon followed by an announcement that he, along with other family members, would sell their controlling shares of the company to a private investment group. The sale was approved by shareholders on August 30, 1982. As part of the sale, Richard Valle became a consultant to the company.

== Death and aftermath ==
Valle's continued to lose money during the 1980s. On December 27, 1991, the last three Valle's Steak House restaurants that were part of the Valle's chain was closed.

After a long illness, Richard Valle died on July 8, 1995, at the age of 64, in Hyannis, Massachusetts. At the time of his death, he was a resident of Dennis, Massachusetts, and had been undergoing treatment at Cape Cod Hospital.

Judith Valle, Richard's sister, had purchased the Portland restaurant from the chain in 1984 and continued operating until August 20, 2000.
