= Fara San Martino =

- Comune
- Comune di Fara San Martino
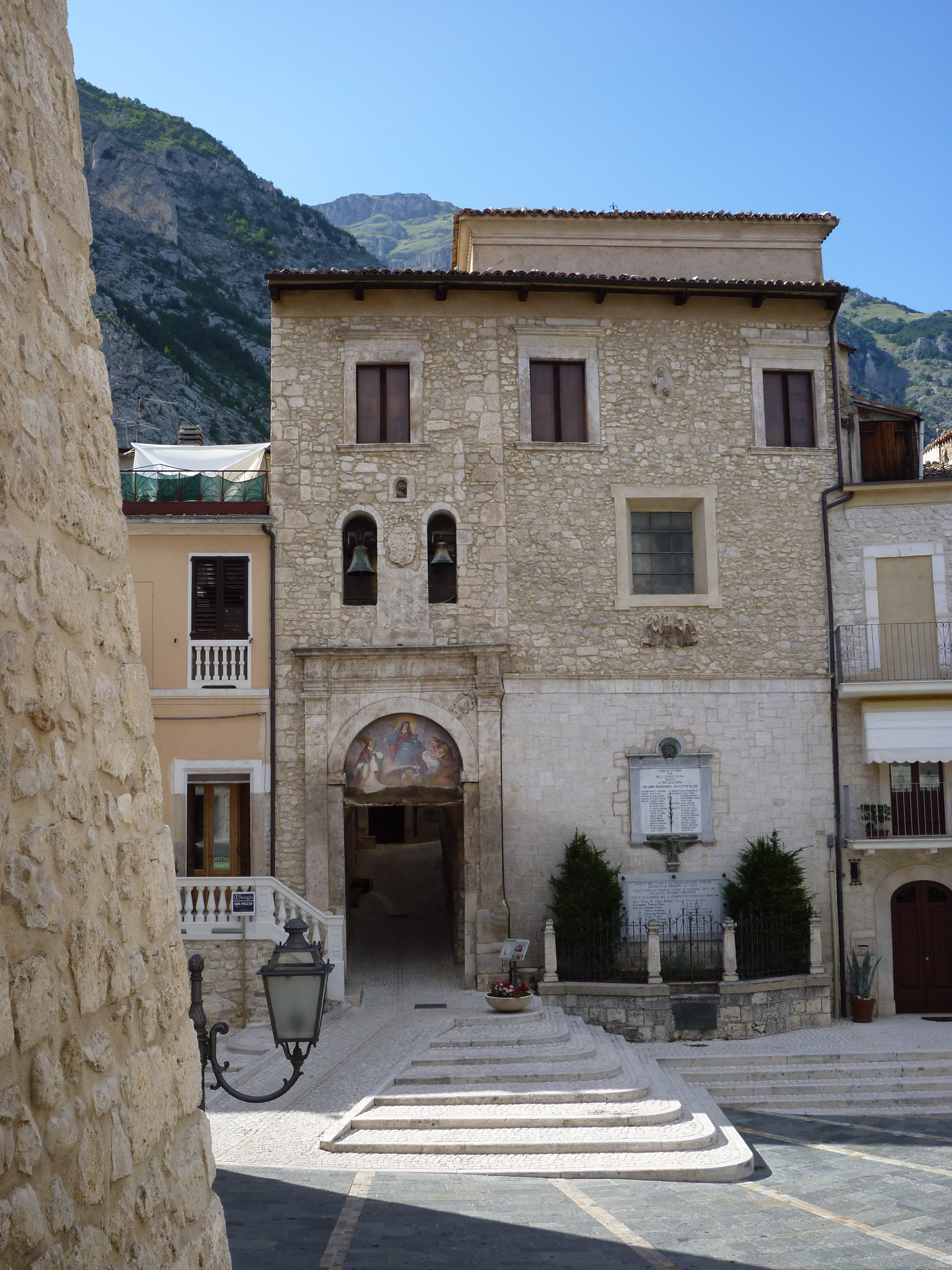
- Church of "Santissima Annunziata"

- Location within Italy Location within Abruzzo
- Coordinates: 42°5′N 14°12′E
- Country: Italy
- Region: Abruzzo
- Province: Chieti (CH)
- Frazioni: Fonte l'Abate

Area
  - Total: 43 km^{2} (17 sq mi)
- Elevation: 440 m (1,440 ft)

Population (2018-01-01)
  - Total: 1,623
  - Density: 38/km^{2} (98/sq mi)
- Demonym: Faresi
- Time zone: UTC+1 (CET)
  - Summer (DST): UTC+2 (CEST)
- Postal code: 66015
- Dialing code: 0872
- ISTAT code: 069031
- Saint day: 24 August
- Website: Official website

Fara San Martino (locally La Fàrë) is a comune and town in the Province of Chieti in the Abruzzo region of Italy. Situated on the outskirts of the Majella National Park, in Abruzzo, the town is known as la capitale della pasta (the capital of pasta), and has a long tradition of pasta production, being home to the headquarters of De Cecco and Delverde.

== See also ==
- Abbey of San Martino in Valle
