= Abbey of San Martino in Valle =

Coordinates: 42.0887°N 14.1924°E

- Abbazia di San Martino in Valle
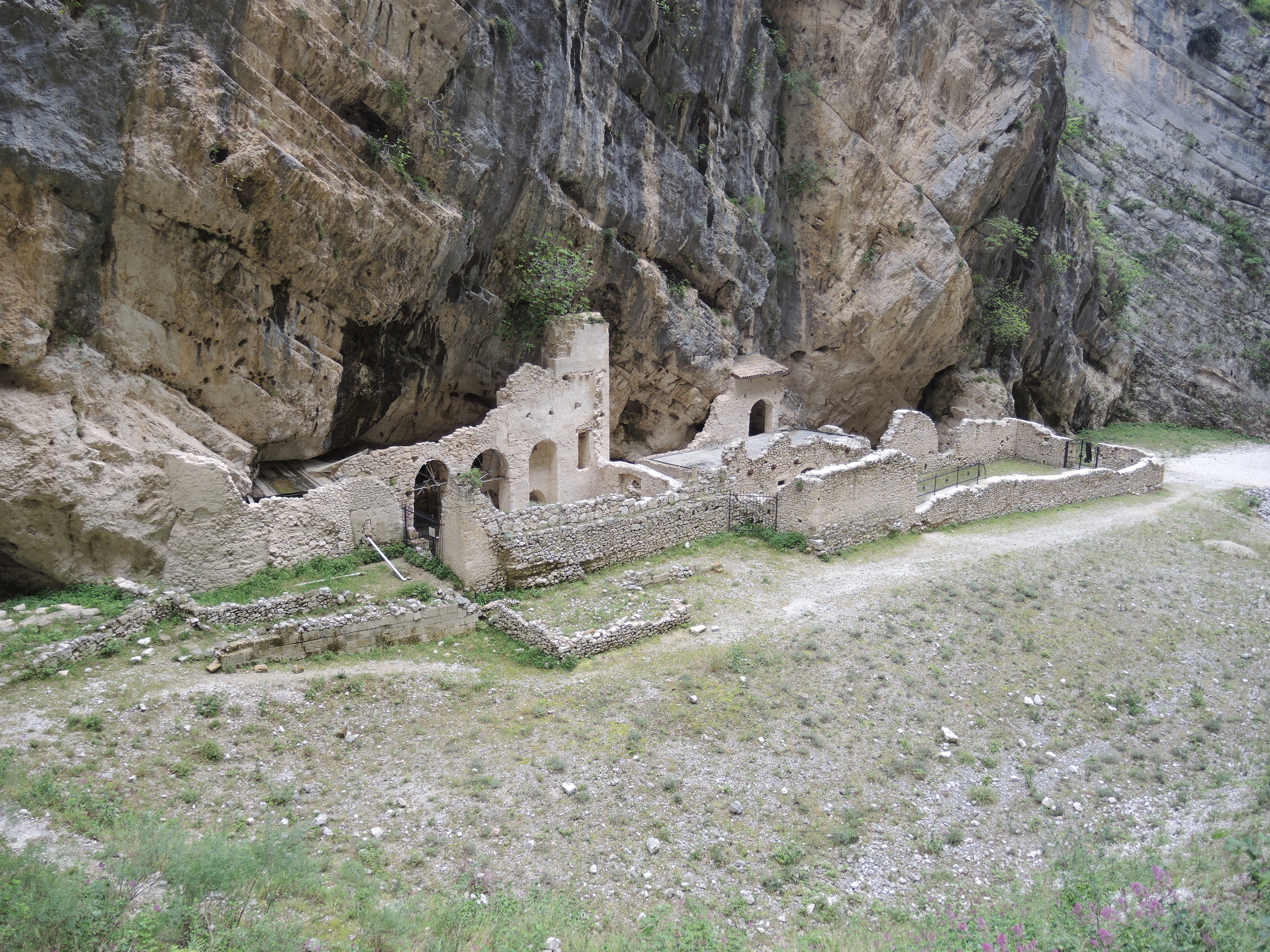
- View of the abbey

- Location: Fara San Martino
- Country: Italy
- Denomination: Catholic

History
- Status: Abbey

Architecture
- Functional status: Active
- Style: Medieval
- Completed: 9th century

Administration
- Diocese: Archdiocese of Chieti–Vasto

Abbazia di San Martino in Valle (Italian for Abbey of San Martino in Valle) is a medieval abbey in Fara San Martino, Province of Chieti (Abruzzo).

== History ==
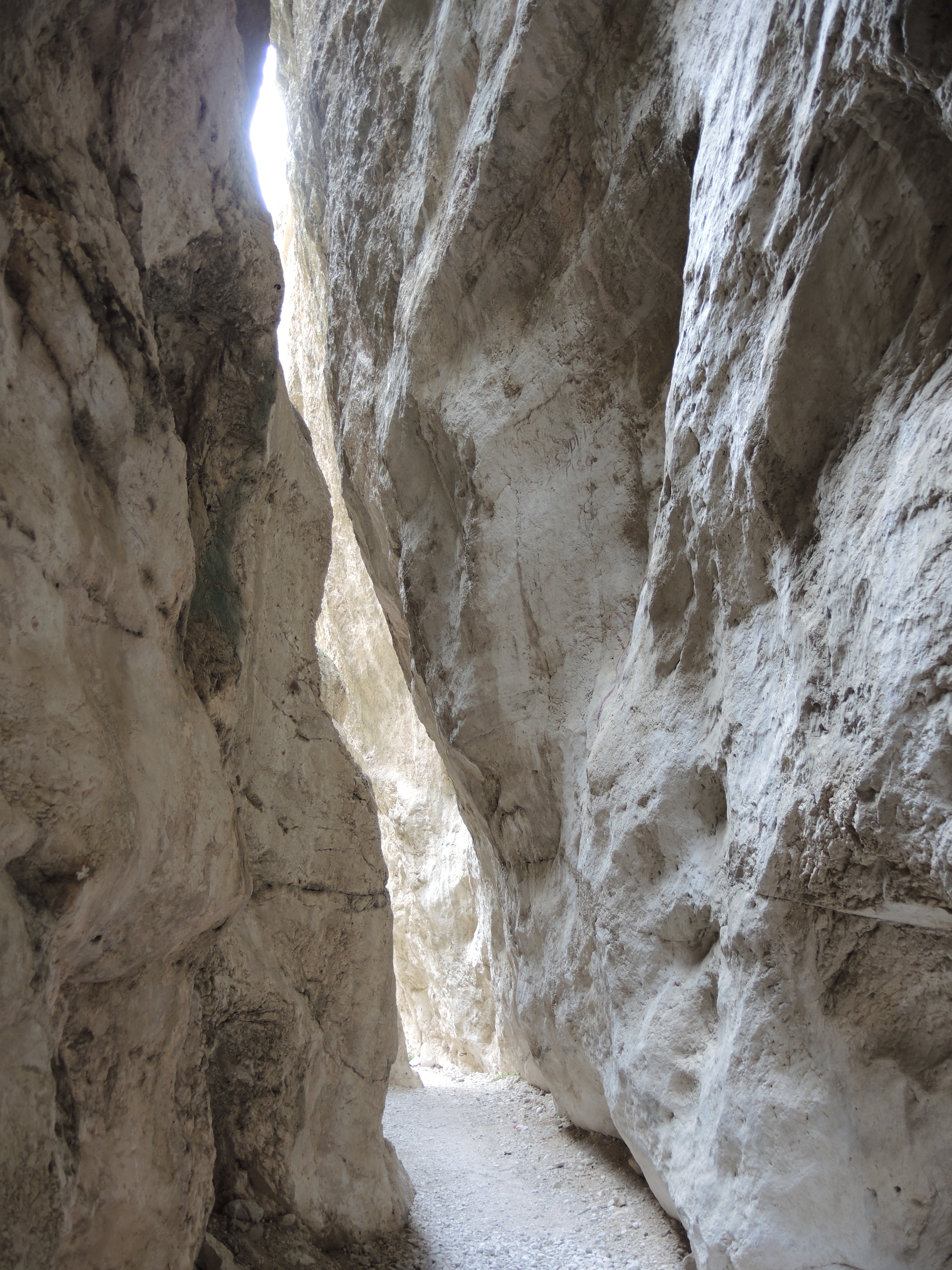
Gole di Fara San Martino

The earliest historical sources about the church located within the Castle of Rocca S. Martino date back to 829, listing it among the possessions of the Monastery of Santo Stefano in Lucania in Tornareccio, which had been donated by Pepin the Short.

In 844, it came under the control of the Bishop of Spoleto and later became part of the possessions of the Abbey of San Liberatore a Majella. In 1044, the Chieti Count Credindeo, on his deathbed and for the redemption of his soul and those of his loved ones (recalling the Capitulars of the Lombard King Liutprand), donated the church to the venerable priest Isberto so that he could endow it with an independent Benedictine Monastery. In 1172, it became part of the Diocese of Chieti. In 1222, Pope Honorius II confirmed Count Credindeo’s donation. The monastery was suppressed in 1452 by Pope Nicholas V and united with the Vatican Chapter, returning to the Archdiocese of Chieti in 1789.

The final abandonment of the monastery occurred on September 8, 1818, due to a flood that covered it with debris. Initial excavations for its recovery took place in 1891, but only with those of 2009 were the remains of the structure fully brought to light.

== Architecture ==
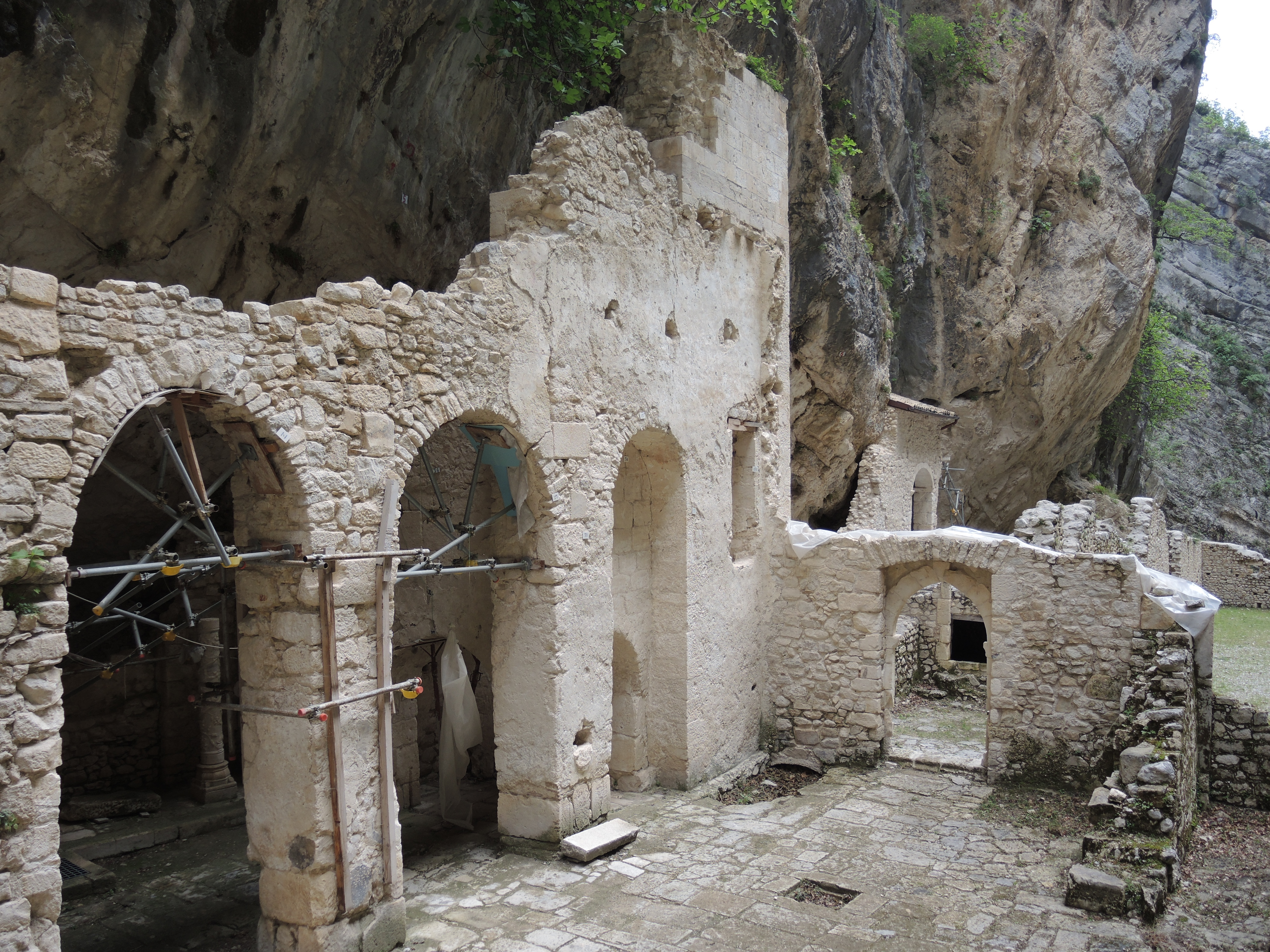
Nave

The remains of the abbey show a gate leading to an inner courtyard bordered by a portico with three arches, on the north side of which is a bell tower with an open arch. The interior of the church must have had three naves with a stone slab floor.

A wall with three arches separates the central nave from the northern one, from which access is gained to what must have been the initial nucleus of the church, carved into the rock, suggesting the origin of the place of worship as a hermitage.

== Bibliography ==
- Mammarella, Luigi (1993) [1989]. "San Martino in Marrucina e S. Martino in Valle". Abbazie e monasteri benedettini in Abruzzo. Cerchio (AQ): Adelmo Polla Editore. pp. 132–133. ISBN 88-7407-026-8.
- Tulipani, Luciana. "L'antica abbazia di San Martino in Valle: dall'eremo rupestre al monastero". Rivista Abruzzese, Rassegna trimestrale di cultura. Anno LXIV, 2011, 4: 322–327.
- Tulipani, Luciana (2010). "L'abbazia benedettina di San Martino in Valle (secc. IX-XVII): Le fonti archeologiche". In Adele Campanelli (ed.). Maiella Madre. San Giovanni Teatino: Mac. pp. 149–169. ISBN 9788890580109.
- Tulipani, Luciana. "Fara San Martino (CH), Abbazia benedettina di San Martino in Valle (secc. IX-XVII)". Quaderni di Archeologia d'Abruzzo. Notiziario della Soprintendenza per I Beni Archeologici dell'Abruzzo, Periodico Annuale. 1/2009. Firenze: 253–260.
- Buonocore, Marco. "Fara S. Martino e l'abbazia di S. Martino in Valle: dalla serie Abbazie dell'Archivio del Capitolo di San Pietro presso la Biblioteca Apostolica Vaticana". Miscellanea Bibliothecae Apostolicae Vaticanae XIX (Studi e Testi, 474).
