= Palombaro =

- Comune
- Comune di Palombaro
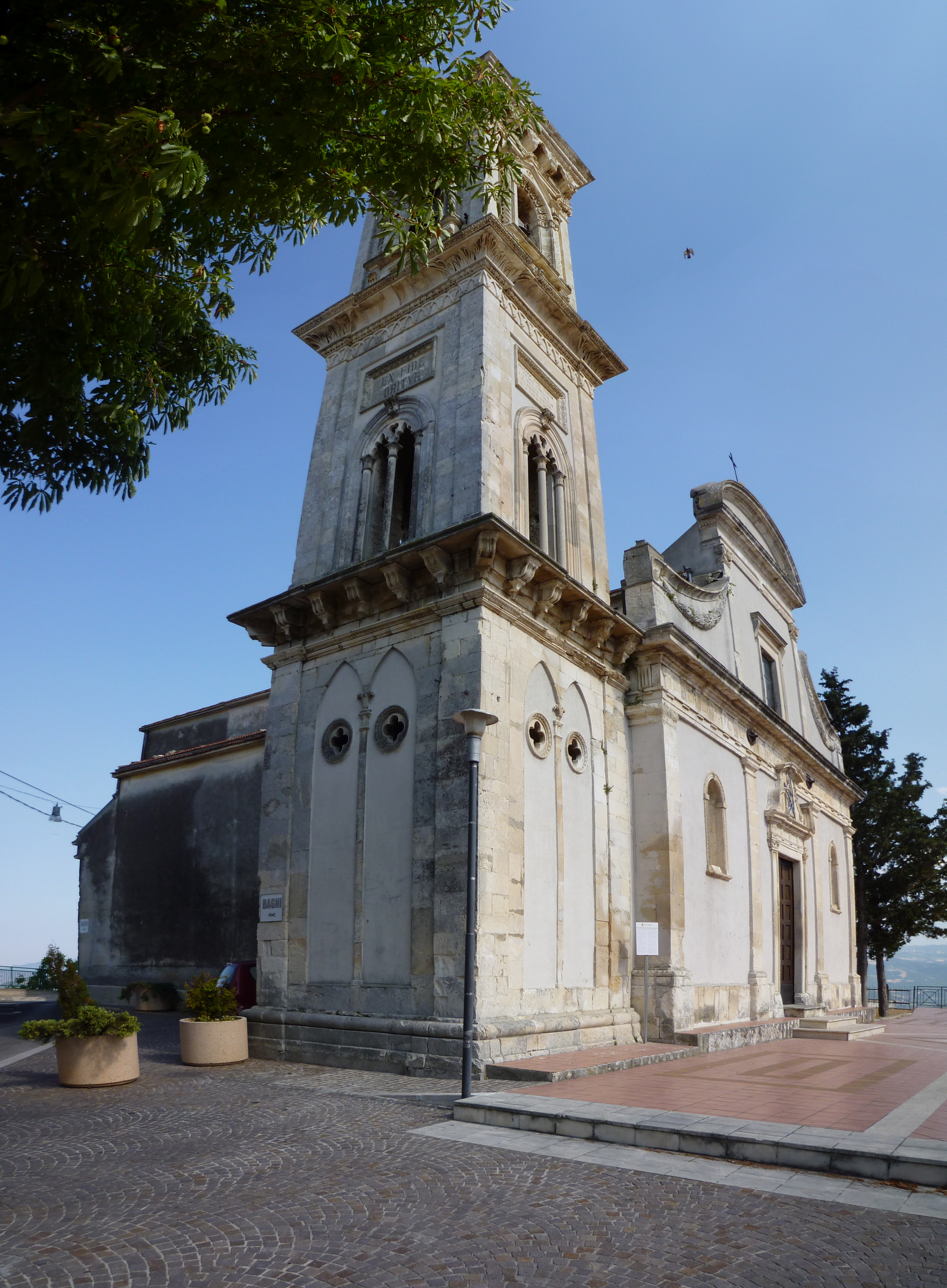
- The Church of Our Lady

- Location within Italy Location within Abruzzo
- Coordinates: 42°7′N 14°14′E
- Country: Italy
- Region: Abruzzo
- Province: Chieti (CH)
- Frazioni: Caprafico, Limiti, Tornelli

Area
  - Total: 17 km^{2} (6.6 sq mi)
- Elevation: 536 m (1,759 ft)

Population (2004)
  - Total: 1,146
  - Density: 67/km^{2} (170/sq mi)
- Demonym: Palombaresi
- Time zone: UTC+1 (CET)
  - Summer (DST): UTC+2 (CEST)
- Postal code: 66010
- Dialing code: 0871
- ISTAT code: 069062
- Patron saint: Madonna della Libera
- Saint day: 3 November
- Website: Official website

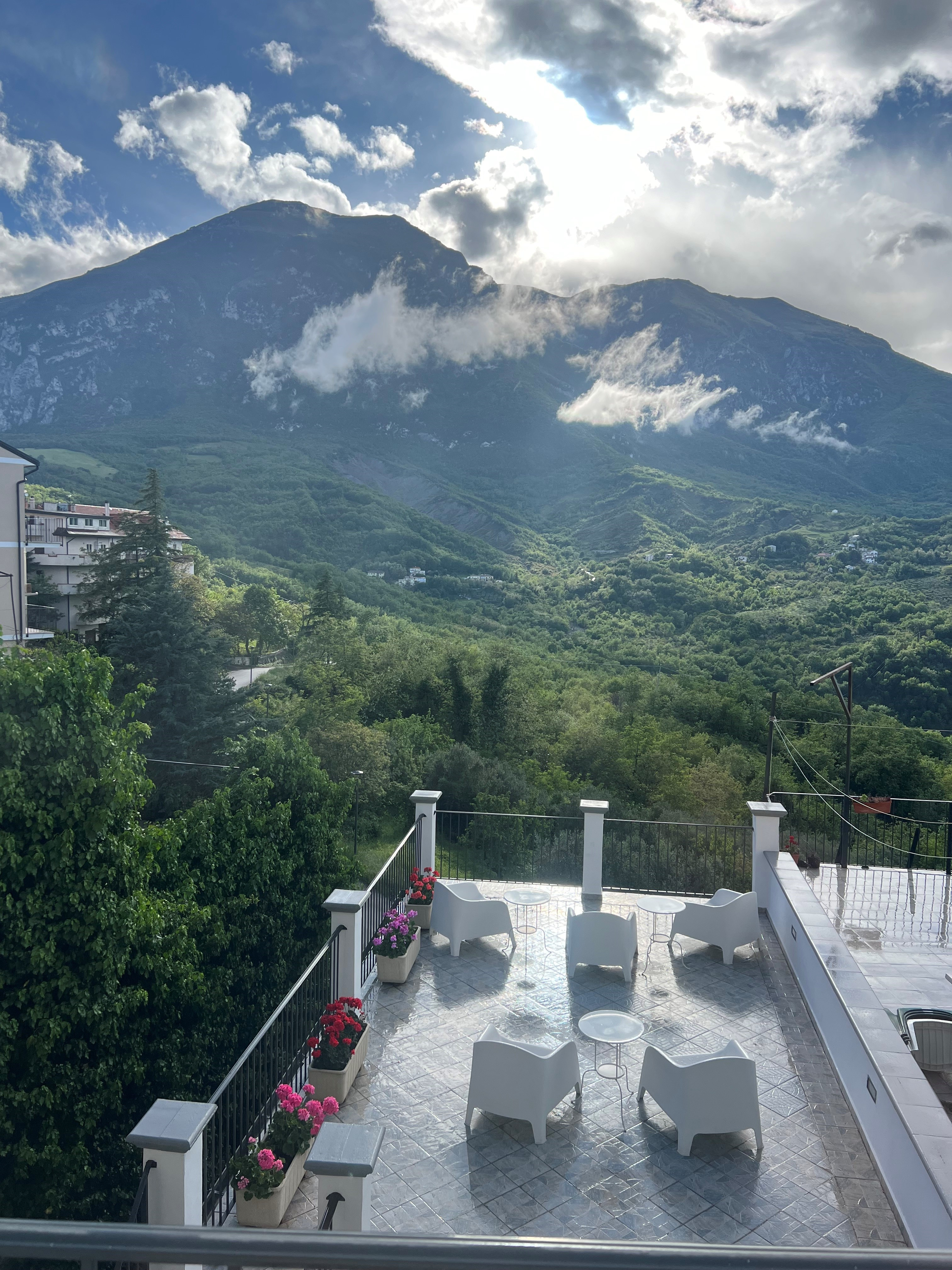

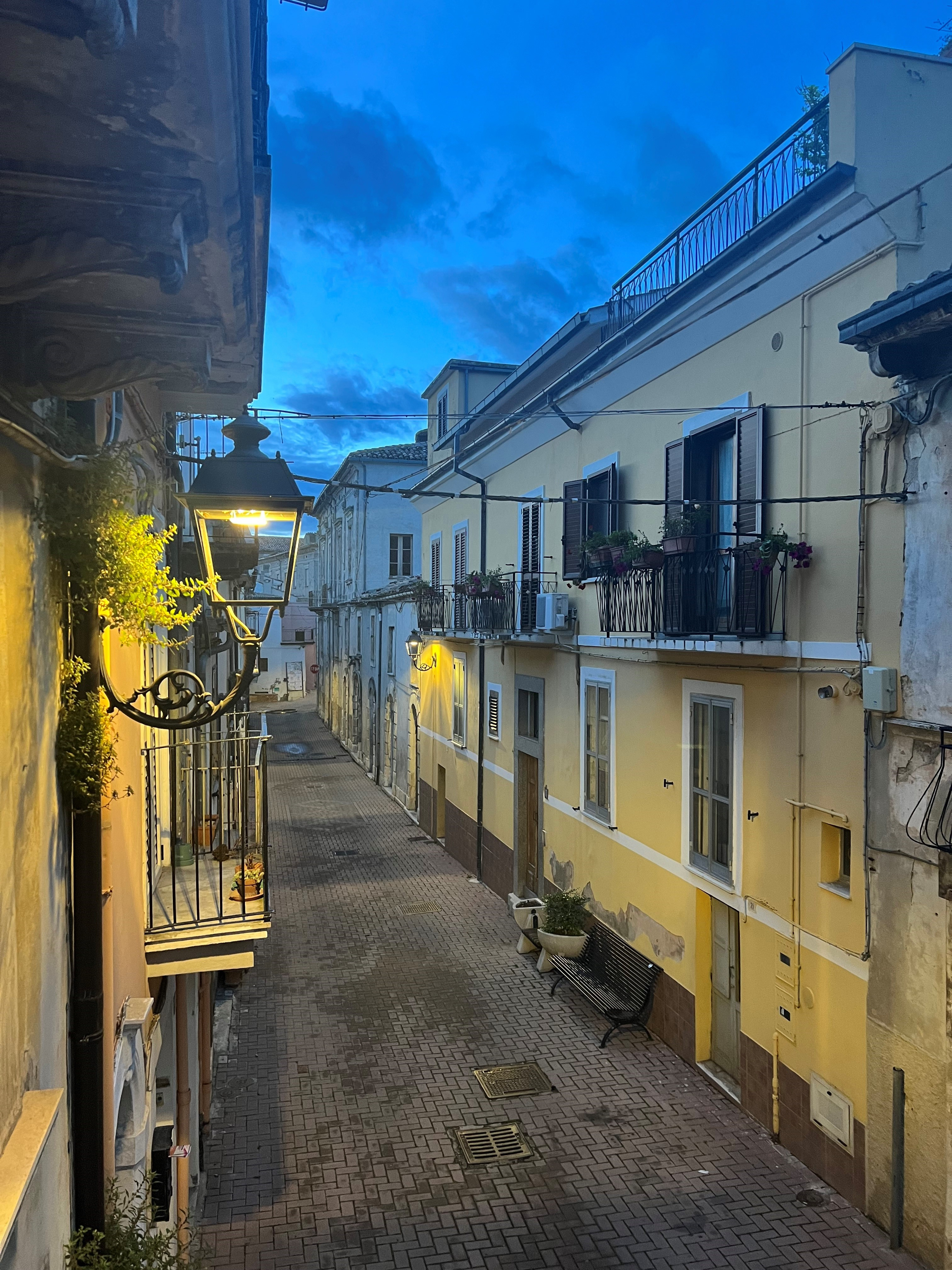

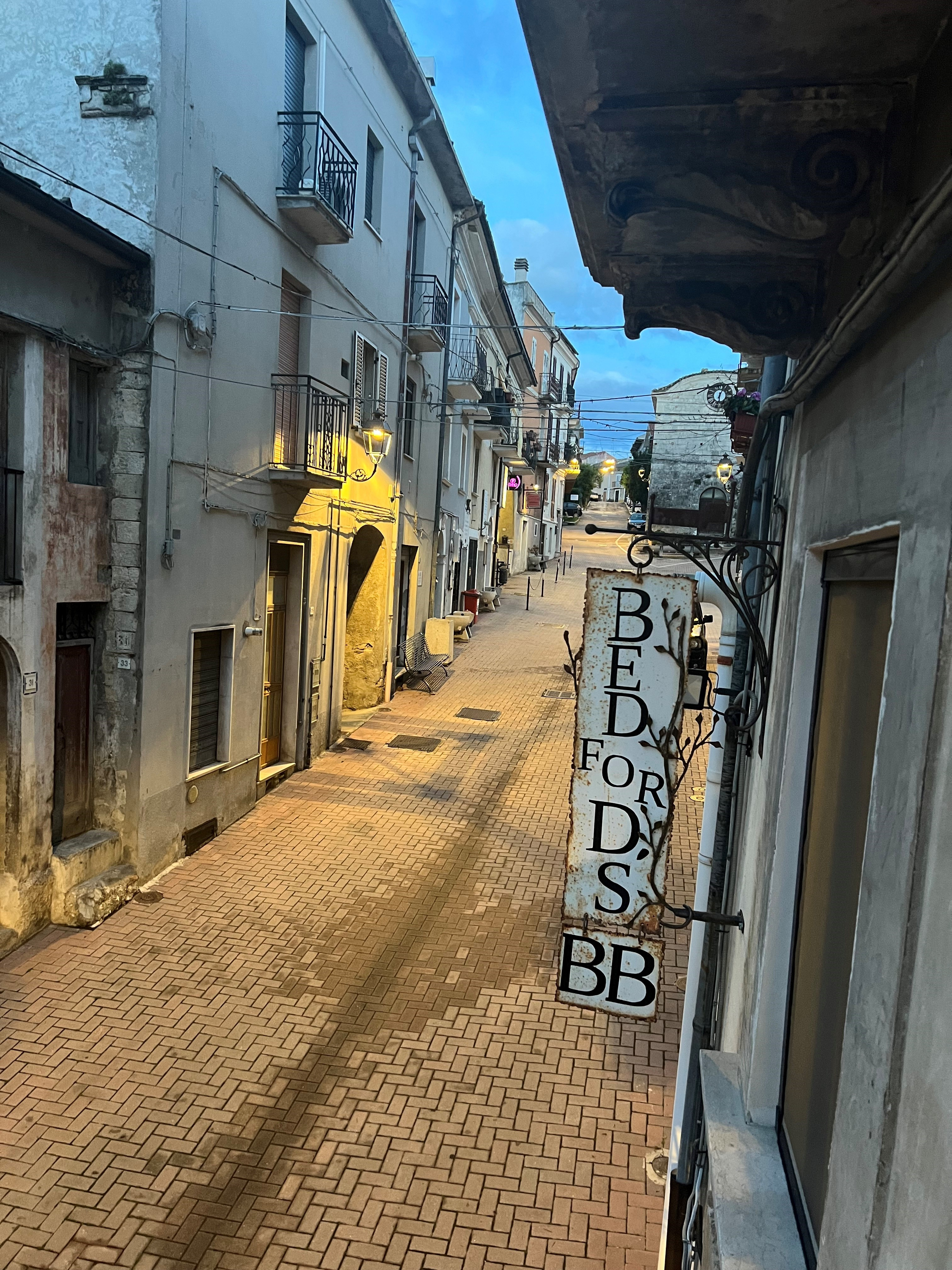
Palombaro Corso UmbertO1 Facing North

Palombaro is a comune and town in the Province of Chieti in the Abruzzo region of Italy.

== See also ==
- Hermitage of Sant'Angelo
