= Hermitage of Sant'Angelo, Lettomanoppello =

Hermitage in L'Aquila, Italy

Coordinates: 42.2097°N 14.0541°E

Hermitage of Sant'Angelo
- Eremo di Sant'Angelo
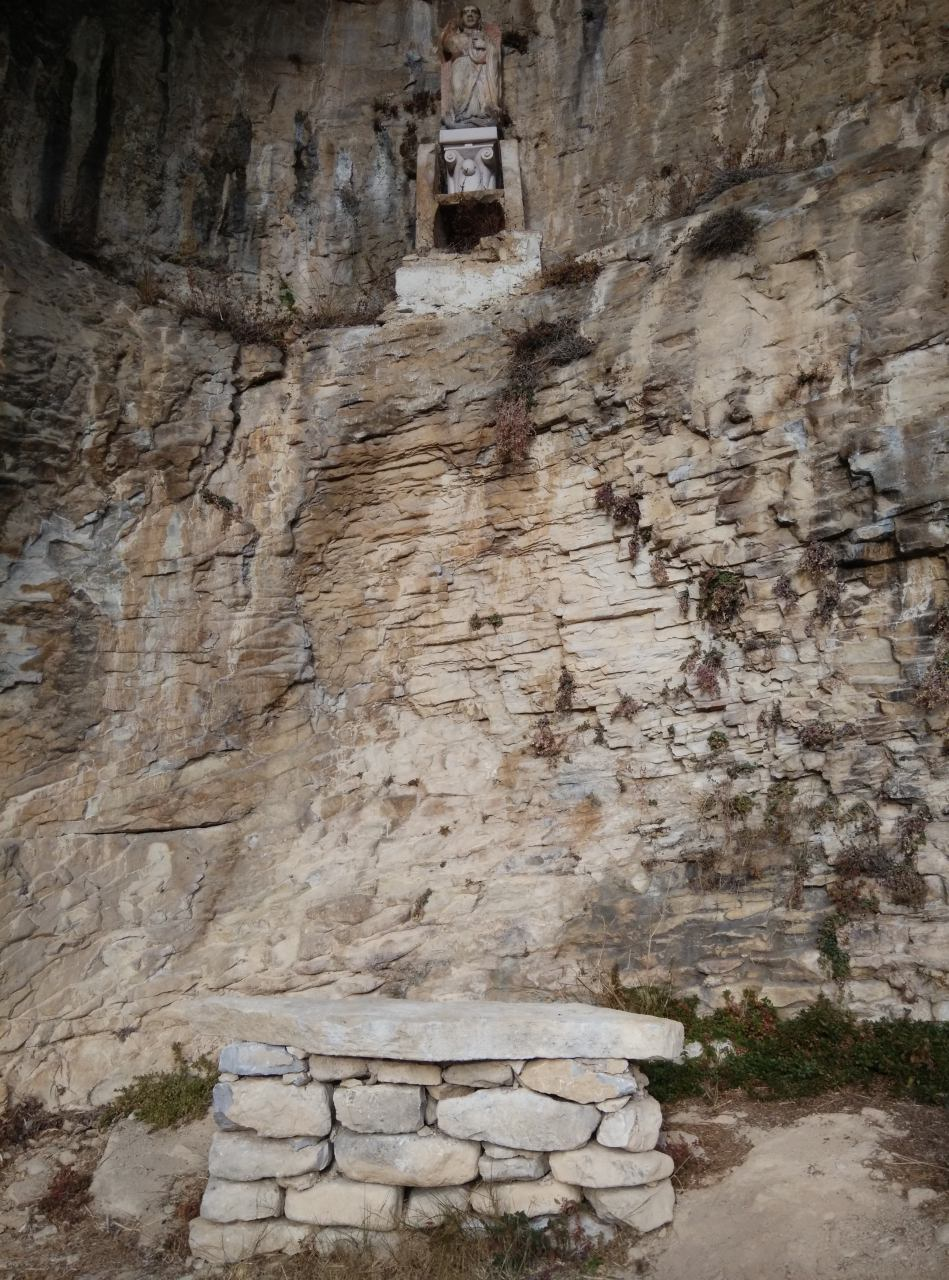
- View of the hermitage

- Location within Abruzzo

Religion
- Affiliation: Roman Catholic
- Province: Province of Pescara
- Region: Abruzzo

Location
- Municipality: Lettomanoppello
- State: Italy
- Interactive map of Hermitage of Sant'Angelo

Eremo di Sant'Angelo (Italian for Hermitage of Sant'Angelo) is an hermitage located in Lettomanoppello, Province of Pescara (Abruzzo, Italy).

== History ==
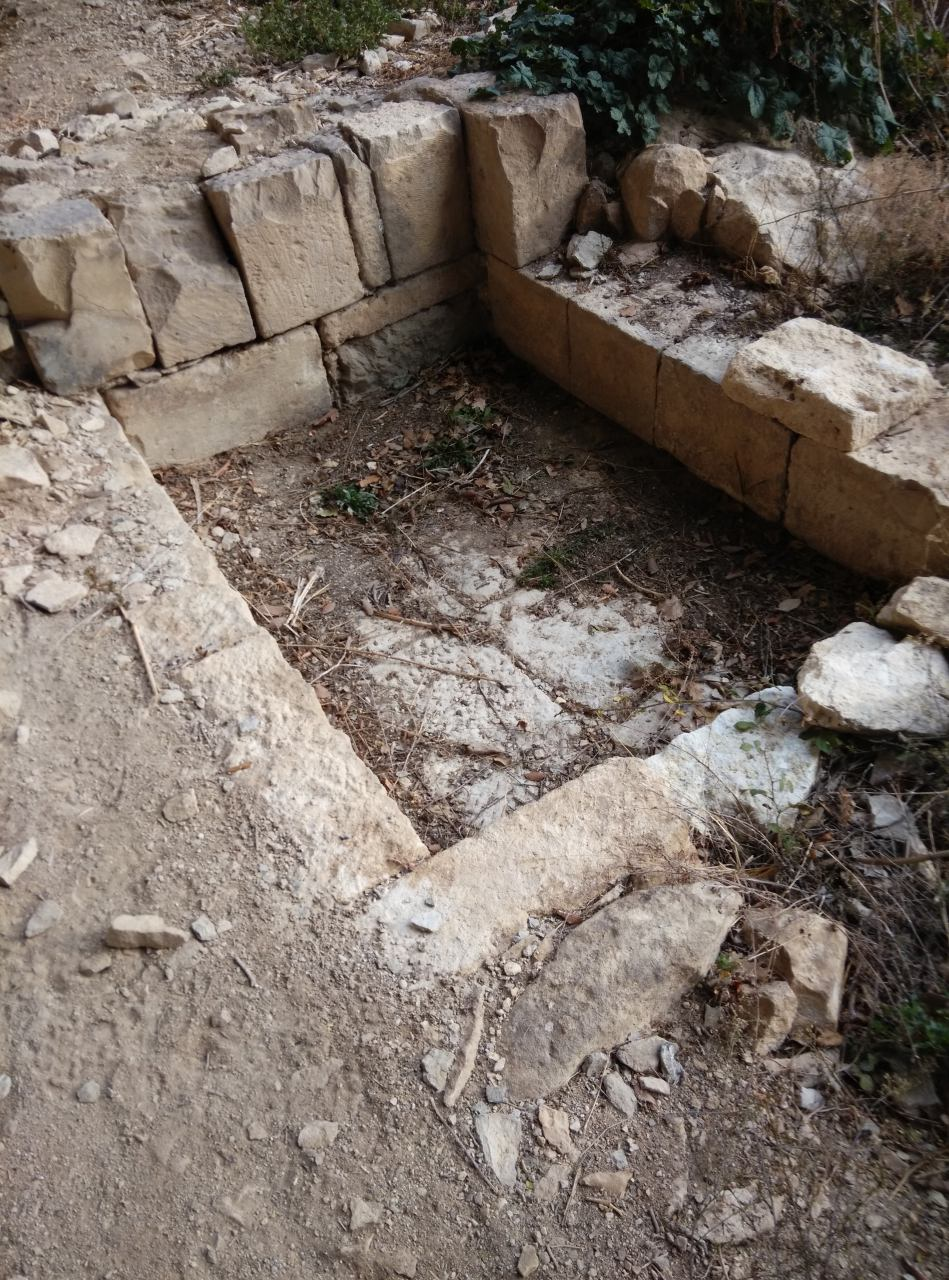
Remains of the church

There is no definite information about the origin of the hermitage. The only source is the Decrees of the First Holy Visit of the Bishop of Chieti Giosuè Maria Saggese from 1844, which mentions the presence of a ruined church in the district of S. Angelo in Lettomanoppello, where an annual procession was held every May 8.

A possible dating of the hermitage can be inferred from the statue of Saint Michael the Archangel found inside it, believed to be the work of the same artisans who sculpted the statue of the Angel Gabriel placed beside the window of the apse of the Church of San Tommaso in Caramanico Terme, dating back to the 13th century.

== Architecture ==
The cave is about 22 meters wide and 8 meters deep, divided in two by a rocky wall. Inside the entrance hall is a rectangular enclosure paved with stone slabs, called the bed of Sant'Angelo, which could represent the remains of the ancient church mentioned by Saggese.

High up in the center of the cave, placed on a capital, is the statue of Saint Michael the Archangel, previously likely housed inside the church. The statue currently present in the hermitage is a reproduction of the original, which is kept in the Museo delle Genti d'Abruzzo in Pescara.

== Sources ==
- Micati, Edoardo (2000). "Grotta di San Domenico". Eremi d'Abruzzo. Guida ai luoghi di culto rupestri (in Italian). Pescara: Carsa Edizioni. pp. 118–119. ISBN 88-85854-74-5.
