= Valle's Steak House =

American restaurant chain

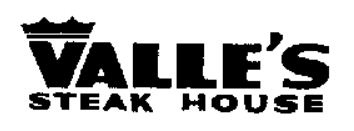
- Type: Private until 1968 public offering; subsequently went private in a 1982 leveraged buy out
- Industry: Dining
- Founded: 1933; 93 years ago
- Defunct: 2000; 26 years ago
- Fate: Sold off assets to private investors
- Headquarters: Newton, Massachusetts
- Key people: Donald Valle, Richard Valle, Judith Valle, and Arthur W. Hanson
- Products: Valle's Steak House specialized in prime steaks and lobsters
- Revenue: $69.5 million in 1981 (peak earnings)
- Number of employees: 3,600

Valle's Steak House was an American chain of restaurants that operated on the East Coast of the United States from 1933 to 2000. The chain's menu focused on steaks and lobsters. A family-run business, Valle's aggressively expanded during the early 1970s but was unable to weather the financial challenges of the gas crisis and the resulting economic downturn; increasing labor costs, the death of its founder, and the changing dining habits of its customers. The last Valle's Steak House closed in August 2000.

== Key personnel ==
- Donald Valle was an American restaurateur who owned and managed the eponymously named Valle's Steak House, from 1933 until his death in 1977. Valle was born in Lettomanopello, Italy in 1908 and immigrated to the United States in 1912 at the age of four. His family settled in Portland, Maine, where Valle eventually opened his first restaurant in 1933. Valle was known as a hard working businessman who logged 14- to 18-hour days throughout his career. Valle was married to the former Sue Crone and had two children, Richard and Judith Valle.
- Richard Valle was the son of Donald and Sue Valle. Richard Valle was a Korean War veteran who assumed a prominent role in the company during the 1950s. Following the death of his father, Richard Valle served as the president and chief executive officer until November, 1980 when at the age of 49, he was succeeded by Arthur W. Hanson. Richard Valle then assumed the role of company chairman. He maintained that position until he sold his controlling shares of the company in 1982. Richard Valle died on July 8, 1995, at the age of 64.
- Judith Valle was the daughter and second child of Donald and Sue Valle. Judith Valle worked as the company vice-president until she, along with other Valle family members, sold their controlling shares of stock to a private investment group in 1982. Subsequently, she used the proceeds from the sale to purchase the original Valle's Steak House located in Portland. Judith Valle operated the restaurant from 1984 until its closure in 2000.
- Arthur W. Hanson assumed control and ownership of the company in 1982. He began his career with Cleaves Food Service Corporation of Silver Spring, Maryland in 1950. In 1959 he joined Valle's as the manager of one of the firm's steakhouses in his home town of Kittery, Maine. Donald Valle appointed him vice president one year later and by 1963 he had been elevated to executive vice president for operations where he was responsible for development, logistics, staffing and training. Hanson remained in control of the company until its closure in 1991. Following the closure, Hanson moved to Aventura, Florida, where he worked in the real estate business until his retirement in 2012. Hanson died three years later at the age of 88.

== Business model ==
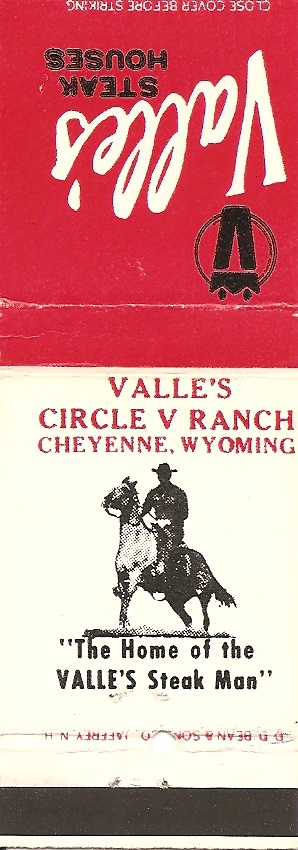
Match book cover that featured Valle's "Circle V" Ranch in Wyoming

Valle's Steak House operated as a full-service, high volume, low margin restaurant that emphasized prime steaks, fresh seafood, and Maine lobsters. Each of the restaurants was built to seat between 800 and 1400 customers. A large wait staff trained to provide prompt service allowed for a fast turnover of tables by keeping the average dinner time to less than an hour. By the mid-1960s the Boston area restaurants alone were serving over 12,000 lobsters each Friday night as part of their double lobster special and the chain was serving over 40,000 lobsters a week.

Early in his career, Donald Valle bypassed regional meat suppliers and established exclusive agreements with Swift and Company in Chicago which shipped beef directly by rail car to his Maine restaurants. Vertically integrated, most of the company's beef originated from Valle's own ranch in Wyoming called the "Circle V" and was then shipped to slaughterhouses in Chicago. Valle also invested heavily in making his restaurants efficient. In a 1965 interview with the Boston Globe Richard Valle showed off a $50,000 automatic dishwashing machine located in the kitchen of the chain's new $1.5 million Braintree, Massachusetts, restaurant. Valle also pointed out the row of broilers and the large, in-house bakery that allowed the Braintree location to serve 5,000 customers a day.

Donald Valle had a reputation as a tireless worker and expected the same level of effort from his employees. Once, when taking a group of restaurant owners through one of his steak houses, Valle pointed out how trim his workers were because they stayed so busy. When one of the visitors pointed to a heavy set employee, Valle joked "He's new. Come back in a couple of months and you will see he's slimmed down."

Training at Valle's was like going through boot camp but without all the pushups. It lasted six months. During that time they worked you like a rented mule. Not many trainees actually finished. You had to know the restaurant inside and out. — Former Valle's manager

Valle's business model emphasized food over liquor with food accounting for over 85% of the company's revenues. "We haven't been in the business since 1933 from selling liquor but good food and good service." Richard Valle said in a 1980 interview.

== Early history and expansion ==
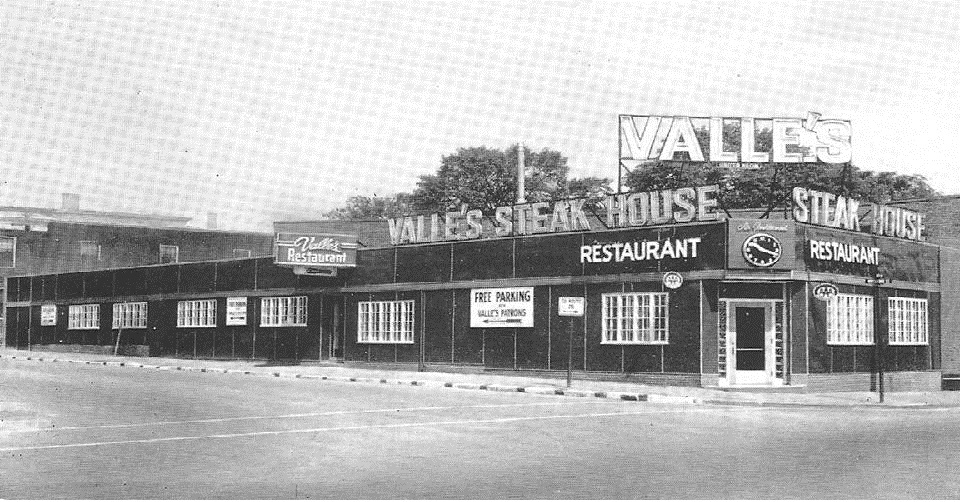
After operating a small cafe, Donald Valle purchased a larger restaurant in Portland, Maine, and named it "Valle's Steak House"

Valle's Steak House began as a 12-seat café in Portland, Maine in 1933. The cafe was purchased at the end of Prohibition by Donald Valle. The cafe was successful and allowed Valle to purchase a larger restaurant in Portland's Woodfords Corner and then a nightclub in Scarborough, Maine which he then converted into a restaurant. Valle next expanded to Kittery, Maine where he constructed his first restaurant that was custom designed as a steak house. In the mid-1960s Valle expanded to Massachusetts where he established three Boston-area steak houses in Saugus, Newton, and Braintree. They became, and remained, three of the busiest restaurants in the chain. In 1968 the company went public and its shares were listed on the American Stock Exchange. By 1969, Valle's was serving over 200,000 customers a week, had 1,300 employees on its payroll, and had created and issued over 6,000 of its own credit cards.

By 1970 the company had expanded into Rhode Island, Connecticut, and New York and was experiencing record earnings growth. The success of the company attracted a buyout offer from the Campbell Soup Company. At the time of the offer, Valle's was operating 12 restaurants in Maine, Massachusetts, Rhode Island, Connecticut, and New York and had five additional restaurants being developed. For the financial period ending on March 31, 1970, Valle's had netted $1,448,000 on sales of $19,200,000. Campbell offered to purchase all of the company's assets and assume its liabilities for $38,900,000. Several months after the offer, negotiations collapsed. In the wake of the collapse, Donald Valle stated that the level of control demanded by Campbell would have been detrimental to the continued success of the chain.

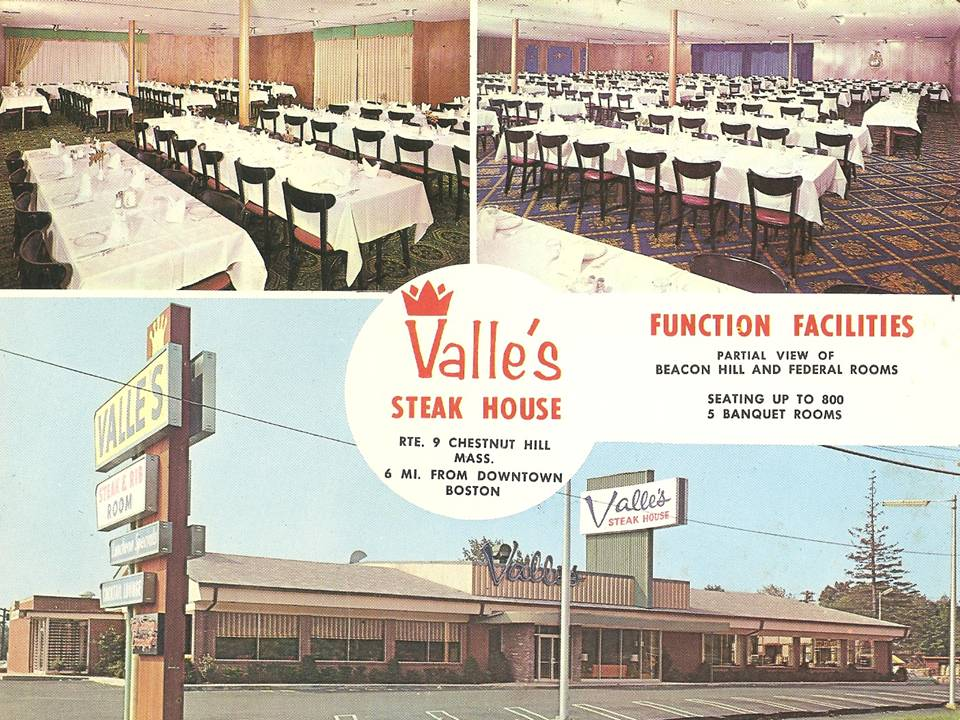
Valle's Steak House headquarters was in Newton, Massachusetts

In 1972, the company had begun construction on two additional steak houses in the Washington, D.C., area, plus another restaurant in Atlanta. Plans for restaurants in Yonkers, Philadelphia, Fort Lauderdale, and Daytona Beach had been approved and construction was slated to begin in 1973. Valle's had also agreed to sell a parcel of land next to its Hartford restaurant to a national motel chain for $325,000 and to serve as the hotel's sole banquet, lounge, and dining facility.

One of the company's locations was in Saugus, Mass adjacent to the Hilltop Steakhouse that was, for a period of time, the highest grossing restaurant in the United States and often had a waiting time for a table that exceeded an hour. While the Valle's location in Saugus was successful, it was also mocked as "...the place to go when you couldn't get into the Hilltop."

The Braintree, Mass Valle's was the fifth restaurant in the chain to open and one of the busiest. On Thanksgiving Day 1979, the Braintree location "... prepared 1,200 pounds of turkey to serve to an expected 2,000 customers", for a holiday that was only their "... fifth busiest day of the year for the restaurant, behind Mother’s Day, Christmas, Easter, and New Year’s Day.

Revenues and earnings continued to grow into the mid-70s but at a slower rate. Growing inflation, unemployment and rising gas prices caused Richard Valle to warn investors that although the company would continue to expand, earnings would not be able to maintain their momentum. "Inflation, the cautious attitude of the consumer, and the energy crisis are uncertainties facing the industry." By 1977 both revenues and profits had begun to decline.

== Economic challenges, declining sales, and closure ==
Donald Valle's death in 1977 saddled the Valle family with an estate tax bill it was not prepared to pay. Combined with declining sales and increasing costs from the firm's continued expansion, in 1981 Richard and Judith Valle attempted to sell their controlling shares in the company to a group of non-family executives and private investors for $17,500,000. Two different proposals were provided to shareholders over a 24-month period. At the time of the proposed sale, the Valle family and its trusts owned 66.7% of the company's 2.5 million common stock shares outstanding. The company was operating 32 restaurants that despite generating $65,900,000 in sales, had lost $569,000 for the year ending on March 31, 1981. During the effort to sell their shares, Richard Valle stepped aside as president of the company. In his place, Arthur W. Hanson, 54, formerly executive vice president of operations became president and also acquired the newly created title of chief executive officer. Richard Valle described the change as "the start of [a] regrouping" that would allow him to focus on the firm's long-term strategy as the chairman. Prior to the finalization of the buyout, Valle's had already begun to close restaurants for this first time in its history. Among those that were closed was the Rochester, New York store that had opened in 1971 and had never turned a profit.

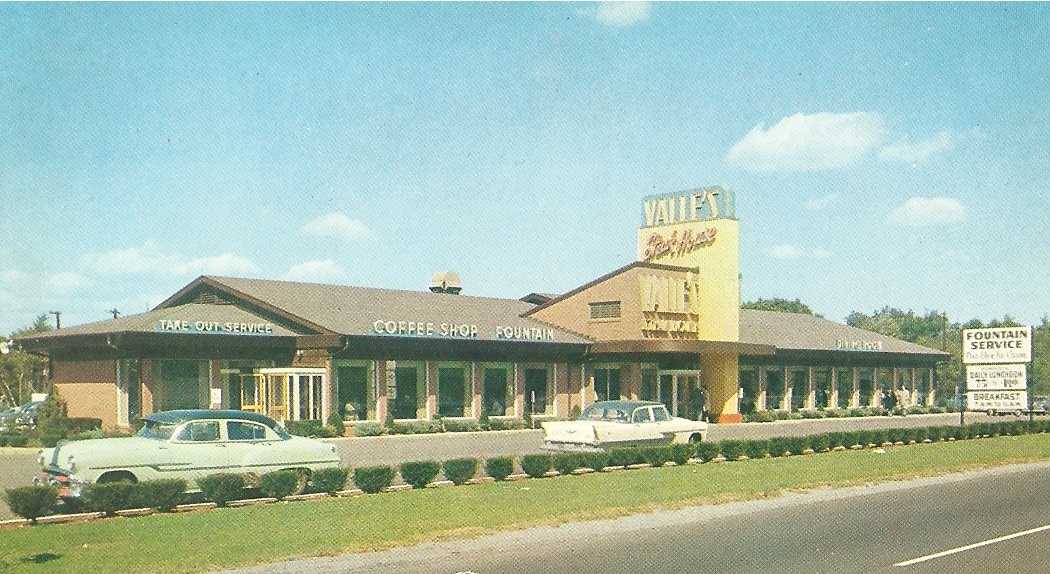
The Valle's in Kittery, Maine was the first custom built restaurant in the Valle's Steak House chain and was among the last to close.

After the buyout, the chain continued to sell off properties. Between 1982 and 1984 the company sold all of its Florida locations, none of which had been open for more than seven years. By the mid-1980s some of the company's largest restaurants outside of Florida had also closed to include Fall River, Atlanta, and Miami. The Portland restaurant was among those that were sold in 1983 when Judith Valle, using funds from the buyout, purchased the Portland Valle's Steak House from the company and operated the restaurant as an independent entity. Another important development in 1983 was Arthur Hanson creating the Polar Bear Restaurant Corporation headquartered in Needham, Mass as the parent corporation of the remaining restaurants. By agreement with Judith Valle, she was allowed to use the "Valle's Steak House" name for her Portland restaurant.

The last three Valle's Steak House restaurants operating as part of Hanson's corporation closed on Friday, December 27, 1991. The restaurants were located in Kittery, Maine; Andover, Mass; and Hartford, Connecticut.

Judith Valle's restaurant continued operating in Portland as "Valle's Steak House" until it finally closed its doors on Sunday, August 20, 2000.

=== Factors and events contributing to the closing ===
A number of reasons contributed to the decline of the Valle's Steak House chain.

- Inheritance taxes. The Valle family was unable to pay the sizable inheritance taxes levied on the estate of Donald Valle when he died in 1977 and were forced to liquidate the business in order to meet their obligation to the government. In a June 2000 interview, Judith Valle said, "No matter how much business we did, we couldn't pay the government. We couldn't break even. It was a huge tax burden, with compounding interest." Susan Collins (R), the U.S. Senator from Maine subsequently used Valle's Steak House as an example of the adverse effects of federal tax policies and argued for revised federal laws that eased the burden of estate taxes, especially on family owned businesses.

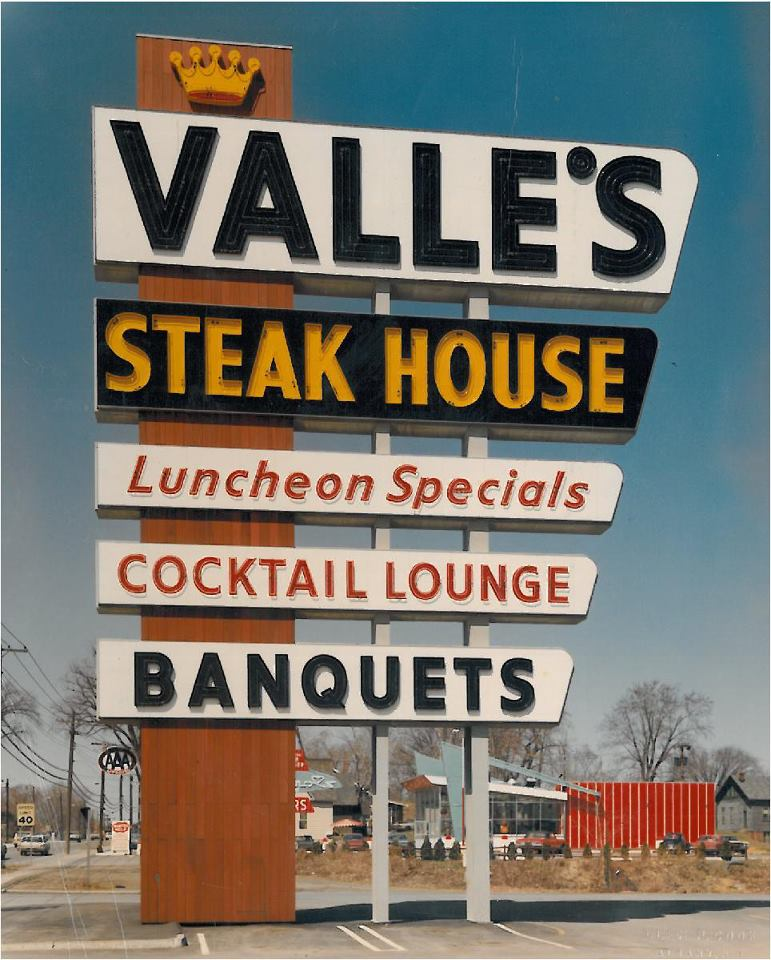
Valle's sign outside of the Albany, New York restaurant. Photo courtesy of Saxton Signs, Castleton, New York.

- Economic turbulence. The gas crisis, soaring inflation, and rising labor costs battered the chain from the mid-70s through the 1980s. Other companies in the restaurant industry, particularly those in a similar price niche to Valle's, also suffered from declining sales. In a July 1980 interview with the Boston Globe, Richard Valle said "The guy who went out twice a week now goes out once, and the retired senior citizen, a large proportion of the business, trades down in the items he orders." Valle also cited the steady increases in the minimum wage as having a "... a ripple effect. If you pay your kitchen men $3.10, you have to give your cooks more money, the chef, the meat cutter, the baker, the hostess, the cashier." Rising labor costs were exacerbated by the 1981 elimination of the "tip credit" which allowed restaurants to reduce the hourly wages of their wait staffs by a portion of the tip. As a result, Valle's was forced to repeatedly raise prices to offset the higher labor costs and predictably, customer counts dropped.
- Obsolete business model. Working against Valle's attempt to maintain its revenues was the emphasis of food over liquor despite the fact that the sale of alcohol featured higher markups. Valle's also placed a strong emphasis on service and because of that shunned the self-service salad-bar concept that many restaurants had introduced to reduce labor costs. As energy costs increased, Valle's found the costs of maintaining their expansive restaurants with banquet rooms that seated up to 1,000 to be a burden. "People aren't having the big 300 to 500 person weddings anymore," said Richard Valle in a 1980 interview. "Weddings are now more like 100 people [as are] the annual Christmas banquets that seated 500 to 900 or the big retirement party." Richard Valle calculated the average size of the 280 banquets one restaurant booked in 1979 and it came to 77.5 people. Supporting the large restaurants were five acre parking areas that also contributed to the company's overhead costs. By the late 1970s, Richard Valle had designed a downsized restaurant that was less costly to staff, heat, light, and maintain and would need only two and a half acres of land. By then, the company's revenues had begun to deteriorate and Valle could not implement the new design.

Valle's was also faulted for the straight line architecture of its large dining rooms that caused some critics to compare the restaurant to a cafeteria. Other critics questioned the wisdom of using a regional New England menu in southern locations such as Atlanta where customers of the early 1970s were unfamiliar with clam chowder, baked stuffed lobsters, and New England–style pot roast.

In 1972 ... Atlanta wasn't as cosmopolitan as it is today. It was still very Southern. The idea of a Northeastern steak house didn't really excite people there. I can't tell you how many times people would ask, 'Where's the fried chicken? Where's the mac and cheese? Where are the collard greens? — Former Valle's manager

== Aftermath ==
Valle's Steak House was a landmark East Coast restaurant for decades and continues to be discussed in various articles and on blog sites. Artifacts from the chain are sold widely on eBay and other web sites.

Valle's Steak House, once located at 465 William S. Canning Boulevard, Fall River, has been gone for nearly 30 years but still brings back fond memories for many locals. The restaurant opened without much fanfare in time for Christmas in late December 1970. It served up steaks and a variety of lobster dishes, braised shortribs with sauce Jardiniere and remember the Bloody Marys? When the Fall River Valle's opened, it was one in a small chain founded in 1933. By the time it closed, there were more than 30 Valle's along the East Coast. — 2012 article from the Fall River, Mass "Herald News"

Since 1991, many of the Valle's restaurants have been razed or, in some cases, repurposed. The Andover location which was among the last to close, still stands and has been used as a comedy club and a bar and grill. As of 2013 it is a part of the Massachusetts-based Italian restaurant chain named "Chateau." The Braintree restaurant that was once the largest and one of the busiest in the chain subsequently became a "Hilltop Steak House" and served in that capacity until 2006 when it was torn down to make way for a Toyota dealership. The location is remembered for then presidential candidate Ronald Reagan making a 1980 campaign speech at a South Shore Chamber of Commerce luncheon held in the restaurant's main banquet room.

The Kittery location still stands but is no longer a restaurant.
