= Biathlon at the 2025 Winter World University Games – Women's sprint =

Women's sprint at the Torino 2025 FISU World University Games
- Venue: Pragelato
- Date: 18 February 2025
- Competitors: 52 from 18 nations
- Winning time: 22:14.4

Medalists
| 1st place, gold medalist(s) | | Barbara Skrobiszewska | Poland |
| 2nd place, silver medalist(s) | | Amelia Liszka | Poland |
| 3rd place, bronze medalist(s) | | Arina Kryukova | Kazakhstan |

The women’s sprint competition of the 2025 Winter World University Games was held on 18 January 2025.

== Results ==
The race was started at 13:05.

| Rank | Bib | Name | Country | Time | Penalties (P+S) | Deficit |
|---|---|---|---|---|---|---|
| 1st place, gold medalist(s) | 3 | Barbara Skrobiszewska | Poland | 22:14.4 | 1 (1+0) | |
| 2nd place, silver medalist(s) | 13 | Amelia Liszka | Poland | 23:09.0 | 1 (0+1) | +54.6 |
| 3rd place, bronze medalist(s) | 22 | Arina Kryukova | Kazakhstan | 23:17.6 | 2 (0+2) | +1:03.2 |
| 4 | 9 | Erika Osterman | Sweden | 23:44.9 | 2 (1+1) | +1:30.5 |
| 5 | 35 | Oleksandra Merkushyna | Ukraine | 23:45.9 | 3 (1+2) | +1:31.5 |
| 6 | 34 | Luise Müller | Germany | 24:00.6 | 4 (2+2) | +1:46.2 |
| 7 | 32 | Wilma Björn | Sweden | 24:02.9 | 2 (2+0) | +1:48.5 |
| 8 | 33 | Amélie Broutier | France | 24:14.3 | 4 (0+4) | +1:59.9 |
| 9 | 31 | Daryna Chalyk | Ukraine | 24:15.4 | 5 (3+2) | +2:01.0 |
| 10 | 6 | Frida Achrén | Finland | 24:27.6 | 2 (0+2) | +2:13.2 |
| 11 | 10 | Noémie Remonnay | France | 24:39.2 | 6 (2+4) | +2:24.8 |
| 12 | 40 | Nora Lignell | Sweden | 24:43.5 | 1 (1+0) | +2:29.1 |
| 13 | 50 | Lisa Siberchicot | France | 24:43.9 | 5 (2+3) | +2:29.5 |
| 14 | 45 | Aisha Rakisheva | Kazakhstan | 24:46.8 | 4 (2+2) | +2:32.4 |
| 15 | 1 | Viivi Jylänki | Finland | 24:57.5 | 1 (0+1) | +2:43.1 |
| 16 | 24 | Wiktoria Celczyńska | Poland | 24:58.6 | 5 (2+3) | +2:44.2 |
| 17 | 16 | Ema Zvarová | Slovakia | 24:58.7 | 1 (1+0) | +2:44.3 |
| 18 | 27 | Milana Geneva | Kazakhstan | 25:08.5 | 4 (0+4) | +2:54.1 |
| 19 | 18 | Misa Sasaki | Japan | 25:14.0 | 4 (0+4) | +2:59.6 |
| 20 | 4 | Svatava Mikysková | Czech Republic | 25:18.1 | 3 (1+2) | +3:03.7 |
| 21 | 2 | Alina Skripkina | Kazakhstan | 25:22.6 | 4 (1+3) | +3:08.2 |
| 22 | 26 | Anael Mezzacasa | Italy | 25:31.0 | 1 (1+0) | +3:16.6 |
| 23 | 17 | Liliia Steblyna | Ukraine | 25:45.0 | 7 (4+3) | +3:30.6 |
| 24 | 37 | Sanni Oikkonen | Finland | 25:47.1 | 5 (1+4) | +3:32.7 |
| 25 | 23 | Anna Nędza-Kubiniec | Poland | 25:48.1 | 7 (5+2) | +3:33.7 |
| 26 | 5 | Aliah Turner | Canada | 25:57.0 | 3 (1+2) | +3:42.6 |
| 27 | 51 | Majka Germata | Poland | 26:13.1 | 5 (1+4) | +3:58.7 |
| 28 | 25 | Lea Meszárosová | Slovakia | 26:20.6 | 3 (3+0) | +4:06.2 |
| 29 | 30 | Kim Seung-gyo | South Korea | 26:21.8 | 2 (1+1) | +4:07.4 |
| 30 | 28 | Eliška Fiedlerová | Czech Republic | 26:22.5 | 4 (4+0) | +4:08.1 |
| 31 | 38 | Danika Burke | Canada | 26:36.4 | 3 (0+3) | +4:22.0 |
| 32 | 39 | Veronika Novotná | Czech Republic | 26:40.0 | 6 (3+3) | +4:25.6 |
| 33 | 15 | Anna Perry | Canada | 26:46.2 | 4 (3+1) | +4:31.8 |
| 34 | 44 | Quinn Morgan | Canada | 26:50.6 | 4 (1+3) | +4:36.2 |
| 35 | 14 | Irati Cuadrado | Spain | 27:00.4 | 8 (4+4) | +4:46.0 |
| 36 | 41 | Inka Remes | Finland | 27:00.7 | 6 (2+4) | +4:46.3 |
| 37 | 43 | Aneta Novotná | Czech Republic | 27:12.9 | 7 (3+4) | +4:58.5 |
| 38 | 7 | Dolcie Tanguay | United States | 27:13.6 | 4 (1+3) | +4:59.2 |
| 39 | 29 | Kaisa Bosek | United States | 27:31.5 | 3 (3+0) | +5:17.1 |
| 40 | 12 | Hannah Chipman | United States | 28:12.8 | 5 (3+2) | +5:58.4 |
| 41 | 20 | Pauline Puusaar | Estonia | 28:16.9 | 5 (3+2) | +6:02.5 |
| 42 | 11 | Isabella Moon | Australia | 28:17.0 | 5 (2+3) | +6:02.6 |
| 43 | 42 | Ella Niedre | Canada | 28:31.3 | 6 (1+5) | +6:16.9 |
| 44 | 21 | Audrey Lahammer | United States | 28:44.0 | 4 (1+3) | +6:29.6 |
| 45 | 46 | Bridget Reusch | United States | 29:45.1 | 6 (1+5) | +7:30.7 |
| 46 | 36 | Isabelle Caza | Canada | 30:05.1 | 6 (2+4) | +7:50.7 |
| 47 | 19 | Cara Loates | Great Britain | 30:24.1 | 7 (3+4) | +8:09.7 |
| 48 | 48 | Cheon Su-ji | South Korea | 30:47.4 | 7 (3+4) | +8:33.0 |
| 49 | 52 | Maeve Lindsay | United States | 31:25.0 | 7 (5+2) | +9:10.6 |
| 50 | 49 | Choi Soo-lyn | South Korea | 31:52.7 | 6 (2+4) | +9:38.3 |
| 51 | 8 | Hong So-yeon | South Korea | 38:07.6 | 7 (4+3) | +15:53.2 |
| | 47 | Kseniia Prykhodko | Ukraine | DNS | | |
