= Biathlon at the 2025 Winter World University Games – Men's pursuit =

Men's pursuit at the Torino 2025 FISU World University Games
- Venue: Pragelato
- Date: 20 February 2025
- Competitors: 47 from 18 nations
- Winning time: 37:48.9

Medalists
| 1st place, gold medalist(s) | | Bohdan Borkovskyi | Ukraine |
| 2nd place, silver medalist(s) | | Serhii Suprun | Ukraine |
| 3rd place, bronze medalist(s) | | Paul Føntaine | France |

The men's pursuit competition of the 2025 Winter World University Games was held on 20 January 2025.

== Results ==
The race was started at 10:05.

| Rank | Bib | Name | Country | Time | Penalties (P+P+S+S) | Deficit |
|---|---|---|---|---|---|---|
| 1st place, gold medalist(s) | 3 | Bohdan Borkovskyi | Ukraine | 37:48.9 | 4 (0+2+1+1) | |
| 2nd place, silver medalist(s) | 6 | Serhii Suprun | Ukraine | 38:17.8 | 4 (0+0+2+2) | +28.9 |
| 3rd place, bronze medalist(s) | 7 | Paul Føntaine | France | 38:22.2 | 4 (0+1+1+2) | +33.3 |
| 4 | 4 | Nathanaël Peaquin | France | 38:57.5 | 5 (0+1+3+1) | +1:08.6 |
| 5 | 1 | Nikita Akimov | Kazakhstan | 39:08.7 | 4 (0+0+3+1) | +1:19.8 |
| 6 | 13 | Vladislav Kireyev | Kazakhstan | 39:23.0 | 3 (1+1+0+1) | +1:34.1 |
| 7 | 5 | Jakub Potoniec | Poland | 39:37.0 | 4 (0+2+1+1) | +1:48.1 |
| 8 | 11 | Frederik Madersbacher Eide | Germany | 39:52.4 | 1 (0+0+0+1) | +2:03.5 |
| 9 | 9 | Kirill Bauer | Kazakhstan | 40:14.7 | 1 (0+0+1+0) | +2:25.8 |
| 10 | 2 | Knut Vikström | Sweden | 40:29.7 | 6 (0+1+2+3) | +2:40.8 |
| 11 | 23 | Yerzhanat Kuandyk | Kazakhstan | 40:37.2 | 2 (0+1+1+0) | +2:48.3 |
| 12 | 14 | Adrien Baylac | France | 40:38.6 | 3 (0+1+1+1) | +2:49.7 |
| 13 | 19 | Hjalmar Gedda | Sweden | 40:40.2 | 5 (0+1+3+1) | +2:51.3 |
| 14 | 10 | Roman Borovyk | Ukraine | 41:05.4 | 6 (1+2+3+0) | +3:16.5 |
| 15 | 17 | Matyáš Martan | Czech Republic | 41:29.5 | 5 (1+1+2+1) | +3:40.6 |
| 16 | 12 | Luděk Abrahám | Czech Republic | 41:30.6 | 9 (2+3+2+2) | +3:41.7 |
| 17 | 16 | Patrik Kuuttinen | Finland | 41:33.3 | 4 (0+0+2+2) | +3:44.4 |
| 18 | 20 | Janik Löw | Germany | 41:37.4 | 5 (0+1+1+3) | +3:48.5 |
| 19 | 22 | Kacper Brzóska | Poland | 42:10.6 | 4 (1+0+1+2) | +4:21.7 |
| 20 | 21 | Gabriel Curtaz | Italy | 42:16.5 | 4 (1+2+0+1) | +4:27.6 |
| 21 | 24 | Karl Grönland | Sweden | 43:40.4 | 5 (2+1+1+1) | +5:51.5 |
| 22 | 15 | Maciej Łapka | Poland | 45:11.6 | 9 (3+3+1+2) | +7:22.7 |
| 23 | 29 | Noah Bradford | Australia | 46:07.0 | 8 (1+3+2+2) | +8:18.1 |
| 24 | 27 | Mariusz Pływaczyk | Poland | 46:28.8 | 4 (1+0+1+2) | +8:39.9 |
| 25 | 35 | Jeong Se-yeong | South Korea | 46:49.6 | 5 (1+1+2+1) | +9:00.7 |
| 26 | 28 | Liam Simons | Canada | 47:34.0 | 5 (2+1+1+1) | +9:45.1 |
| | 25 | Dawid Miller | Poland | LAP | 11 (3+3+5) | |
| | 30 | Rodrigo Azabal | Spain | LAP | 5 (3+2) | |
| | 31 | Mathieu Lacasse | Canada | LAP | 8 (3+2+3) | |
| | 32 | Jakub Kováčik | Slovakia | LAP | 5 (1+1+3) | |
| | 33 | Lance Sekora | Canada | LAP | 3 (0+2+1) | |
| | 34 | Mizuki Nishimoto | Japan | LAP | 8 (2+2+4) | |
| | 36 | Simon Gauthier | Canada | LAP | 3 (2+1) | |
| | 37 | Diego Schillaci | United States | LAP | 2 (2) | |
| | 38 | Ian Burgess | United States | LAP | 2 (0+0+2) | |
| | 39 | Ben Sites | United States | LAP | 5 (2+3) | |
| | 40 | Dawson Schigol | Canada | LAP | 6 (0+2+4) | |
| | 41 | Ethan Clarke | Great Britain | LAP | 5 (2+3) | |
| | 42 | Jon Visser | Netherlands | LAP | 5 (5) | |
| | 43 | Zachary Grappolini | Canada | LAP | 5 (3+2) | |
| | 44 | Ryan Houseman | United States | LAP | 4 (4) | |
| | 45 | Han Seong-hyeon | South Korea | LAP | 0 (0+0) | |
| | 8 | Petr Hák | Czech Republic | DNS | | |
| | 18 | Kalle Loukkaanhuhta | Finland | DNS | | |
| | 26 | Vladyslav Chykhar | Ukraine | DNS | | |
| | 46 | Jeon Chan-yu | South Korea | DNS | | |
| | 47 | Kwak Han-sol | South Korea | DNS | | |
