= Biathlon at the 2025 Winter World University Games – Men's sprint =

Men’s sprint at the Torino 2025 FISU World University Games
- Venue: Pragelato
- Date: 18 February 2025
- Competitors: 49 from 17 nations
- Winning time: 23:34.1

Medalists
1st place, gold medalist(s)		Nikita Akimov	Kazakhstan
2nd place, silver medalist(s)		Knut Vikström	Sweden
3rd place, bronze medalist(s)		Bohdan Borkovskyi	Ukraine

The men’s sprint competition of the 2025 Winter World University Games was held on 18 January 2025.

== Results ==
The race was started at 10:05.

Rank	Bib	Name	Country	Time	Penalties (P+S)	Deficit
1st place, gold medalist(s)	30	Nikita Akimov	Kazakhstan	23:34.1	0 (0+0)	
2nd place, silver medalist(s)	31	Knut Vikström	Sweden	23:36.3	1 (0+1)	+2.2
3rd place, bronze medalist(s)	8	Bohdan Borkovskyi	Ukraine	23:39.7	1 (0+1)	+5.6
4	39	Nathanaël Peaquin	France	23:56.6	2 (0+2)	+22.5
5	14	Jakub Potoniec	Poland	23:58.2	1 (0+1)	+24.1
6	18	Serhii Suprun	Ukraine	23:59.6	0 (0+0)	+25.5
7	6	Paul Føntaine	France	24:04.3	1 (0+1)	+30.2
8	32	Petr Hák	Czech Republic	24:05.8	1 (1+0)	+31.7
9	35	Kirill Bauer	Kazakhstan	24:09.2	1 (0+1)	+35.1
10	37	Roman Borovyk	Ukraine	24:19.4	1 (1+0)	+45.3
11	15	Frederik Madersbacher Eide	Germany	24:21.1	0 (0+0)	+47.0
12	17	Luděk Abrahám	Czech Republic	24:28.3	3 (2+1)	+54.2
13	43	Vladislav Kireyev	Kazakhstan	24:34.6	1 (0+1)	+1:00.5
14	28	Adrien Baylac	France	24:39.5	3 (2+1)	+1:05.4
15	12	Maciej Łapka	Poland	25:00.1	4 (3+1)	+1:26.0
16	29	Patrik Kuuttinen	Finland	25:01.7	1 (0+1)	+1:27.6
17	40	Matyáš Martan	Czech Republic	25:07.2	2 (0+2)	+1:33.1
18	19	Kalle Loukkaanhuhta	Finland	25:12.8	4 (2+2)	+1:38.7
19	3	Hjalmar Gedda	Sweden	25:13.4	3 (1+2)	+1:39.3
19	22	Janik Löw	Germany	25:13.4	2 (0+2)	+1:39.3
21	25	Gabriel Curtaz	Italy	25:19.6	1 (0+1)	+1:45.5
22	34	Kacper Brzóska	Poland	25:25.9	2 (0+2)	+1:51.8
23	13	Yerzhanat Kuandyk	Kazakhstan	25:29.0	3 (2+1)	+1:54.9
24	45	Karl Grönland	Sweden	25:35.6	3 (1+2)	+2:01.5
25	44	Dawid Miller	Poland	25:43.9	1 (1+0)	+2:09.8
26	33	Vladyslav Chykhar	Ukraine	25:50.6	2 (1+1)	+2:16.5
27	26	Mariusz Pływaczyk	Poland	26:11.4	1 (0+1)	+2:37.3
28	4	Liam Simons	Canada	26:32.9	2 (0+2)	+2:58.8
29	16	Noah Bradford	Australia	26:33.4	4 (1+3)	+2:59.3
30	2	Rodrigo Azabal Estaún	Spain	26:52.8	4 (3+1)	+3:18.7
31	27	Mathieu Lacasse	Canada	26:56.9	2 (2+0)	+3:22.8
32	10	Jakub Kováčik	Slovakia	27:00.7	2 (1+1)	+3:26.6
33	7	Lance Sekora	Canada	27:16.0	2 (1+1)	+3:41.9
34	20	Mizuki Nishimoto	Japan	27:39.7	7 (3+4)	+4:05.6
35	23	Jeong Se-yeong	South Korea	27:43.8	4 (2+2)	+4:09.7
36	48	Simon Gauthier	Canada	27:50.7	4 (2+2)	+4:16.6
37	21	Diego Schillaci	United States	28:52.5	4 (3+1)	+5:18.4
38	9	Ian Burgess	United States	29:03.7	4 (3+1)	+5:29.6
39	46	Ben Sites	United States	29:04.3	6 (5+1)	+5:30.2
40	49	Dawson Schigol	Canada	29:15.5	3 (2+1)	+5:41.4
41	11	Ethan Clarke	Great Britain	29:25.5	6 (3+3)	+5:51.4
42	38	Jon Visser	Netherlands	29:32.2	6 (3+3)	+5:58.1
43	24	Zachary Grappolini	Canada	29:48.2	4 (3+1)	+6:14.1
44	1	Ryan Houseman	United States	30:54.8	3 (0+3)	+7:20.7
45	42	Han Seong-hyeon	South Korea	31:00.6	5 (2+3)	+7:26.5
46	47	Jeon Chan-yu	South Korea	31:20.6	5 (2+3)	+7:46.5
47	5	Kwak Han-sol	South Korea	35:36.3	2 (1+1)	+12:02.2
	36	Jakub Kocián	Czech Republic	DNS		
	41	Stepan Kinash	Ukraine	DNS		
