= Biathlon at the 2025 Winter World University Games – Women's pursuit =

Women's pursuit at the Torino 2025 FISU World University Games
- Venue: Pragelato
- Date: 20 January 2025
- Competitors: 51 from 18 nations
- Winning time: 37:40.6

Medalists
1st place, gold medalist(s)		Barbara Skrobiszewska	Poland
2nd place, silver medalist(s)		Amelia Liszka	Poland
3rd place, bronze medalist(s)		Daryna Chalyk	Ukraine

The women's pursuit competition of the 2025 Winter World University Games was held on 20 January 2025.

== Results ==
The race was started at 13:05.

Rank	Bib	Name	Country	Time	Penalties (P+P+S+S)	Deficit
1st place, gold medalist(s)	1	Barbara Skrobiszewska	Poland	37:40.6	3 (0+0+2+1)	
2nd place, silver medalist(s)	2	Amelia Liszka	Poland	38:10.6	2 (2+0+0+0)	+30.0
3rd place, bronze medalist(s)	9	Daryna Chalyk	Ukraine	38:38.3	5 (0+1+3+1)	+57.7
4	5	Oleksandra Merkushyna	Ukraine	38:59.0	4 (1+1+0+2)	+1:18.4
5	11	Noémie Remonnay	France	39:06.9	5 (0+2+1+2)	+1:26.3
6	3	Arina Kryukova	Kazakhstan	39:36.4	4 (1+0+1+2)	+1:55.8
7	6	Luise Müller	Germany	39:50.7	5 (0+2+2+1)	+2:10.1
8	18	Milana Geneva	Kazakhstan	40:33.6	3 (1+1+0+1)	+2:53.0
9	4	Erika Osterman	Sweden	40:42.8	5 (2+3+0+0)	+3:02.2
10	8	Amélie Broutier	France	41:09.5	7 (2+0+2+3)	+3:28.9
11	25	Anna Nędza-Kubiniec	Poland	41:16.8	5 (0+1+3+1)	+3:36.2
12	7	Wilma Björn	Sweden	41:23.5	5 (0+4+1+0)	+3:42.9
13	27	Majka Germata	Poland	41:40.3	1 (0+0+1+0)	+3:59.7
14	13	Lisa Siberchicot	France	41:52.7	7 (2+2+2+1)	+4:12.1
15	23	Liliia Steblyna	Ukraine	42:06.7	7 (1+2+2+2)	+4:26.1
16	16	Wiktoria Celczyńska	Poland	42:13.8	6 (1+1+2+2)	+4:33.2
17	19	Misa Sasaki	Japan	42:59.8	5 (1+2+1+1)	+5:19.2
18	36	Inka Remes	Finland	43:18.8	2 (0+0+1+1)	+5:38.2
19	21	Alina Skripkina	Kazakhstan	43:25.5	4 (2+1+0+1)	+5:44.9
20	12	Nora Lignell	Sweden	43:26.5	8 (3+2+1+2)	+5:45.9
21	15	Viivi Jylänki	Finland	43:38.2	6 (2+1+1+2)	+5:57.6
22	10	Frida Achrén	Finland	43:44.6	7 (2+1+2+2)	+6:04.0
23	32	Veronika Novotná	Czech Republic	43:49.2	4 (0+2+1+1)	+6:08.6
24	20	Svatava Mikysková	Czech Republic	44:40.0	8 (2+2+2+2)	+6:59.4
25	24	Sanni Oikkonen	Finland	44:42.4	7 (2+2+2+1)	+7:01.8
26	17	Ema Zvarová	Slovakia	44:55.8	4 (1+1+1+1)	+7:15.2
27	30	Eliška Fiedlerová	Czech Republic	45:08.9	4 (1+0+2+1)	+7:28.3
28	37	Aneta Novotná	Czech Republic	45:38.9	6 (2+0+2+2)	+7:58.3
29	26	Aliah Turner	Canada	45:47.1	5 (0+0+2+3)	+8:06.5
30	29	Kim Seung-gyo	South Korea	46:45.1	5 (0+2+1+2)	+9:04.5
31	34	Quinn Morgan	Canada	46:52.8	6 (2+2+0+2)	+9:12.2
32	31	Danika Burke	Canada	46:58.1	5 (1+1+1+2)	+9:17.5
33	33	Anna Perry	Canada	47:07.5	4 (1+1+0+2)	+9:26.9
34	38	Dolcie Tanguay	United States	48:04.3	6 (2+0+2+2)	+10:23.7
35	47	Cara Loates	Great Britain	49:24.2	3 (0+1+1+1)	+11:43.6
	22	Anael Mezzacasa	Italy	LAP	4 (0+2+2)	
	28	Lea Meszárosová	Slovakia	LAP	3 (2+1+0)	
	35	Irati Cuadrado	Spain	LAP	9 (2+3+4)	
	39	Kaisa Bosek	United States	LAP	3 (1+1+1)	
	40	Hannah Chipman	United States	LAP	5 (2+3)	
	41	Pauline Puusaar	Estonia	LAP	3 (2+1)	
	42	Isabella Moon	Australia	LAP	5 (3+2)	
	43	Ella Niedre	Canada	LAP	6 (4+2)	
	44	Audrey Lahammer	United States	LAP	2 (1+1)	
	45	Bridget Reusch	United States	LAP	3 (3)	
	46	Isabelle Caza	Canada	LAP	2 (0+2)	
	48	Cheon Su-ji	South Korea	LAP	2 (0+1+1)	
	49	Maeve Lindsay	United States	LAP	2 (2)	
	50	Choi Soo-lyn	South Korea	LAP	1 (1)	
	14	Aisha Rakisheva	Kazakhstan	DSQ		
	51	Hong So-yeon	South Korea	DNS		
