= Biathlon at the 2025 Winter World University Games – Men's short individual =

Men’s short individual at the Torino 2025 FISU World University Games
- Biathlon
- Venue: Pragelato
- Date: 14 February 2025
- Competitors: 49 from 18 nations
- Winning time: 38:40.9

Medalists
1st place, gold medalist(s)		Bohdan Borkovskyi	Ukraine
2nd place, silver medalist(s)		Patrik Kuuttinen	Finland
3rd place, bronze medalist(s)		Petr Hák	Czech Republic

The men’s short individual competition of the 2025 Winter World University Games will be held on 14 January 2025.

== Results ==
The race was started at 10:00.

Rank	Bib	Name	Country	Time	Penalties (P+S+P+S)	Deficit
1st place, gold medalist(s)	20	Bohdan Borkovskyi	Ukraine	38:40.9	3 (0+0+1+2)	
2nd place, silver medalist(s)	23	Patrik Kuuttinen	Finland	39:06.4	0 (0+0+0+0)	+25.5
3rd place, bronze medalist(s)	12	Petr Hák	Czech Republic	39:10.1	2 (1+1+0+0)	+29.2
4	45	Serhii Suprun	Ukraine	39:31.1	2 (0+1+0+1)	+50.2
5	37	Vladyslav Chykhar	Ukraine	39:58.9	3 (1+1+0+1)	+1:18.0
6	9	Nikita Akimov	Kazakhstan	40:07.5	3 (1+1+1+0)	+1:26.6
7	28	Hjalmar Gedda	Sweden	40:10.8	3 (1+0+0+2)	+1:29.9
8	27	Frederik Madersbacher	Germany	40:42.1	1 (0+1+0+0)	+2:01.2
9	17	Luděk Abrahám	Czech Republic	40:57.5	4 (0+1+1+2)	+2:16.6
10	6	Kalle Loukkaanhuhta	Finland	41:02.2	5 (0+3+0+2)	+2:21.3
11	2	Kirill Bauer	Kazakhstan	41:07.0	4 (1+1+1+1)	+2:26.1
12	44	Yerzhanat Kuandyk	Kazakhstan	41:12.5	3 (0+1+2+0)	+2:31.6
13	48	Jakub Kocián	Czech Republic	41:34.0	2 (0+1+0+1)	+2:53.1
14	13	Paul Fontaine	France	41:38.5	5 (2+1+1+1)	+2:57.6
15	26	Vadim Kurales	Kazakhstan	41:45.1	6 (4+1+0+1)	+3:04.2
16	4	Roman Borovyk	Ukraine	41:52.3	5 (1+2+1+1)	+3:11.4
17	43	Maciej Łapka	Poland	42:02.4	4 (2+1+1+0)	+3:21.5
18	24	Matyáš Martan	Czech Republic	42:04.4	5 (2+0+0+3)	+3:23.5
19	30	Jakub Potoniec	Poland	42:19.8	5 (0+2+1+2)	+3:38.9
20	36	Stepan Kinash	Ukraine	42:21.1	4 (0+1+1+2)	+3:40.2
21	33	Adrien Baylac	France	42:27.4	4 (1+1+0+2)	+3:46.5
22	16	Knut Vikström	Sweden	42:43.0	6 (2+1+1+2)	+4:02.1
23	47	Nathanaël Peaquin	France	43:02.0	7 (1+3+0+3)	+4:21.1
24	25	Gabriel Curtaz	Italy	43:31.4	5 (1+0+2+2)	+4:50.5
25	49	Karl Grönland	Sweden	43:47.0	6 (1+2+1+2)	+5:06.1
26	31	Kacper Brzóska	Poland	43:56.3	4 (1+1+1+1)	+5:15.4
27	21	Lance Sekora	Canada	44:26.9	3 (1+1+0+1)	+5:46.0
28	15	Noah Bradford	Australia	44:47.0	7 (1+2+1+3)	+6:06.1
29	7	Liam Simons	Canada	44:53.6	6 (1+1+1+3)	+6:12.7
30	39	Mathieu Lacasse	Canada	44:54.3	5 (3+1+0+1)	+6:13.4
31	19	Janik Löw	Germany	45:16.0	8 (4+1+0+3)	+6:35.1
32	14	Rodrigo Azabal	Spain	46:09.8	8 (2+3+1+2)	+7:28.9
33	10	Mariusz Pływaczyk	Poland	46:36.1	6 (3+0+1+2)	+7:55.2
34	22	Dawid Miller	Poland	47:37.4	9 (2+2+2+3)	+8:56.5
35	29	Zachary Grappolini	Canada	47:42.6	6 (1+2+2+1)	+9:01.7
36	3	Mizuki Nishimoto	Japan	48:13.3	9 (3+3+1+2)	+9:32.4
37	38	Jeong Se-yeong	South Korea	48:41.7	9 (1+2+2+4)	+10:00.8
38	42	Ian Burgess	United States	48:53.5	4 (0+3+0+1)	+10:12.6
39	40	Simon Gauthier	Canada	49:47.0	11 (2+3+4+2)	+11:06.1
40	1	Han Seong-hyeon	South Korea	50:56.2	7 (1+4+2+0)	+12:15.3
41	35	Ben Sites	United States	51:14.7	10 (3+1+3+3)	+12:33.8
42	5	Jakub Kováčik	Slovakia	51:16.2	12 (1+4+4+3)	+12:35.3
43	32	Diego Schillaci	United States	52:01.0	11 (1+4+4+2)	+13:20.1
44	11	Ethan Clarke	Great Britain	52:41.0	11 (3+3+2+3)	+14:00.1
45	8	Ryan Houseman	United States	53:25.2	8 (4+0+2+2)	+14:44.3
46	34	Dawson Schigol	Canada	53:30.9	15 (5+3+3+4)	+14:50.0
47	46	Jeon Chan-yu	South Korea	56:55.5	12 (2+4+3+3)	+18:14.6
48	18	Peter van Driel	Netherlands	58:33.6	7 (1+1+1+4)	+19:52.7
	41	Jon Visser	Netherlands	DNS		
