= Biathlon at the 2025 Winter World University Games – Women's short individual =

Women’s short individual at the Torino 2025 FISU World University Games
- Biathlon
- Venue: Pragelato
- Date: 14 February 2025
- Competitors: 50 from 18 nations

The women’s short individual competition of the 2025 Winter World University Games will be held on 14 January 2025.

== Results ==
The race was started at 13:00.

Rank	Bib	Name	Country	Time	Penalties (P+S+P+S)	Deficit
	1	Milana Geneva	Kazakhstan			
	2	Quinn Morgan	Canada			
	3	Dolcie Tanguay	United States			
	4	Cara Loates	Great Britain			
	5	Barbara Skrobiszewska	Poland			
	6	Hannah Chipman	United States			
	7	Frida Achrén	Finland			
	8	Lisa Siberchicot	France			
	9	Sani Oikkonen	Finland			
	10	Svatava Mikysková	Czech Republic			
	11	Lea Meszárosová	Slovakia			
	12	Anael Mezzacasa	Italy			
	13	Pauline Puusaar	Estonia			
	16	Majka Germata	Poland			
	17	Irati Cuadrado	Spain			
	18	Kim Seung-gyo	South Korea			
	19	Polina Yegorova	Kazakhstan			
	20	Anna Perry	Canada			
	21	Luise Müller	Germany			
	22	Misa Sasaki	Japan			
	23	Wilma Björn	Sweden			
	24	Erika Österman	Sweden			
	25	Audrey Lahammer	United States			
	26	Danika Burke	Canada			
	27	Wiktoria Celczyńska	Poland			
	28	Aneta Novotná	Czech Republic			
	29	Inka Remes	Finland			
	30	Daryna Chalyk	Ukraine			
	31	Noémie Remonnay	France			
	32	Kaisa Bosek	United States			
	33	Alina Skripkina	Kazakhstan			
	34	Eliška Fiedlerová	Czech Republic			
	35	Aliah Turner	Canada			
	36	Liliia Steblyna	Ukraine			
	37	Ema Zvarová	Slovakia			
	38	Anna Nędza-Kubiniec	Poland			
	39	Cheon Su-ji	South Korea			
	40	Nora Lignell	Sweden			
	41	Maeve Lindsay	United States			
	42	Isabelle Caza	Canada			
	43	Amelia Liszka	Poland			
	44	Ella Niedre	Canada			
	45	Amélie Broutier	France			
	46	Bridget Reusch	United States			
	47	Aisha Rakisheva	Kazakhstan			
	49	Viivi Jylänki	Finland			
	50	Veronika Novotna	Czech Republic			
	14	Oleksandra Merkushyna	Ukraine	DNS		
	15	Isabella Moon	Australia	DNS		
	48	Kseniia Prykhodko	Ukraine	DNS		
