= Alpine skiing at the 2025 Winter World University Games – Women's combined =

Women's combined at the Torino 2025 FISU World University Games
- Alpine skiing
- Venue: Bardonecchia
- Date: 15 January
- Competitors: 34 from 17 nations
- Winning time: 1:51.20

Medalists
1st place, gold medalist(s)		Emy Charbonnier	France
2nd place, silver medalist(s)		Sophie Nyberg	Sweden
3rd place, bronze medalist(s)		Louison Accambray	France

The women's combined competition of the Alpine skiing at the 2025 Winter World University Games is held on 15 January at Bardonecchia.

== Results ==
The super-G is started at 09:30 and the slalom is started at 13:30.

Rank	Bib	Name	Country	Super-G	Rank	Slalom	Rank	Total	Behind
1st place, gold medalist(s)	27	Emy Charbonnier	France	59.72	1	51.49	3	1:51.20	
2nd place, silver medalist(s)	26	Sophie Nyberg	Sweden	59.88	2	51.93	8	1:51.81	+0.61
3rd place, bronze medalist(s)	12	Louison Accambray	France	1:00.28	3	51.71	6	1:51.99	+0.79
4	2	Marjolaine Ollier	France	1:01.80	5	51.76	7	1:53.56	+2.36
5	7	Elyssa Kuster	Switzerland	1:02.83	13	51.26	1	1:54.09	+2.89
6	5	Mathilde Phillips	Switzerland	1:02.76	11	51.55	4	1:54.31	+3.11
7	3	Anastasiia Shepilenko	Ukraine	1:02.76	11	51.62	5	1:54.38	+3.18
8	19	Barbora Nováková	Czech Republic	1:00.65	4	53.91	18	1:54.56	+3.36
9	1	Isabel Hofherr	Austria	1:02.07	6	52.68	10	1:54.75	+3.55
10	22	Katarína Šrobová	Slovakia	1:03.53	18	51.48	2	1:55.01	+3.81
11	8	Cloe Merloz	France	1:02.69	9	52.61	9	1:55.30	+4.10
12	15	Martina Sacchi	Italy	1:02.60	8	52.81	11	1:55.41	+4.21
13	18	Eleonora Pizzi	Italy	1:03.05	15	53.09	12	1:56.14	+4.94
14	16	Matilde Casse	Italy	1:03.46	17	53.15	13	1:56.61	+5.41
15	10	Nina Lehmann	Switzerland	1:02.71	10	54.33	20	1:57.04	+5.84
16	28	Lilli Dehning	Germany	1:02.44	7	54.73	23	1:57.17	+5.97
17	29	Mikayla Wunsch	Canada	1:02.84	14	54.67	22	1:57.51	+6.31
18	34	Rira Maehana	Japan	1:04.44	22	53.52	15	1:57.96	+6.76
19	9	Matilde Schwencke	Chile	1:04.71	23	53.50	14	1:58.21	+7.01
20	14	Hanna Majtényi	Hungary	1:03.82	19	54.44	21	1:58.26	+7.06
21	30	Lauren Wayland	Canada	1:04.95	24	54.11	19	1:59.06	+7.86
22	25	Jessie Ferguson	Canada	1:06.85	27	53.82	17	2:00.67	+9.47
23	31	Lili Polányi	Hungary	1:05.31	25	55.86	24	2:01.17	+9.97
24	17	Marie-Penelope Robinson	Canada	1:08.85	28	53.80	16	2:02.65	+11.45
25	23	Elle Murphy	Ireland	1:06.83	26	56.65	25	2:03.48	+12.28
26	32	Manon Chad	Lebanon	1:11.72	29	58.04	26	2:09.76	+18.56
27	21	Maureen Lambert	Belgium	1:11.96	30	58.97	27	2:10.93	+19.73
	6	Sára Jedličková	Czech Republic	1:04.01	21	DNF			
	13	Greta Angelini	Italy	1:03.90	20	DNF			
	33	Kizuna Kirikubo	Japan	1:03.13	16	DNF			
	4	Lara Fletzberger	Austria	DNF					
	20	Margherita Cecere	Italy	DNF					
	24	Linda Trejbalová	Czech Republic	DNF					
	11	Anina Zurbriggen	Bulgaria	DNS					
