= Freestyle skiing at the 2025 Winter World University Games – Men's moguls =

Men’s moguls at the Torino 2025 FISU World University Games
- Freestyle skiing
- Venue: Bardonecchia
- Date: 14 February 2025
- Competitors: 24 from 10 nations
- Winning time: 81.68

Medalists
1st place, gold medalist(s)		Akseli Ahvenainen	Finland
2nd place, silver medalist(s)		Shugo Kanno	Japan
3rd place, bronze medalist(s)		Quinn Dawson	Canada

The men's moguls competition of the 2025 Winter World University Games will be held on 14 January 2025.

== Results ==
=== Qualification ===
Qualification was started at 11:45.

Rank	Order	Bib	Name	Country	Time	Score			Total	Notes
Rank	Order	Bib	Name	Country	Time	Turns	Air	Time	Total	Notes
1	17	2	Akseli Ahvenainen	Finland	22.96	50.2	11.96	16.05	78.21	Q
2	9	1	Shima Kawaoka	Japan	23.73	48.5	12.79	14.98	76.27	Q
3	1	6	Shugo Kanno	Japan	23.73	47.4	12.14	14.98	74.52	Q
4	11	13	Antoine Tene	France	25.18	46.7	13.63	12.96	73.29	Q
5	19	10	Marek Gajdečka	Czech Republic	23.07	45.5	11.61	15.90	73.01	Q
6	15	5	Nicolas Weese	Germany	24.61	46.3	12.87	13.76	72.93	Q
7	20	3	Jackson Crockett	United States	23.86	44.1	13.86	14.80	72.76	Q
8	5	4	Quinn Dawson	Canada	24.25	47.0	10.92	14.26	72.18	Q
9	6	16	Fyodor Bugakov	Kazakhstan	23.41	41.5	14.52	15.42	71.44	Q
10	2	9	Aleksi Kaisla	Finland	24.20	46.8	9.94	14.33	71.07	Q
11	22	8	Anton Bondarev	Kazakhstan	24.56	44.6	12.27	13.82	70.69	Q
12	4	19	Maxim Yemelyanov	Kazakhstan	24.53	41.9	13.50	13.87	69.27	Q
13	21	18	Semyon Russakov	Kazakhstan	25.20	42.0	12.93	12.93	67.86	Q
14	24	7	Stephen Boone	United States	24.09	41.4	11.56	14.48	67.44	Q
15	18	14	Vincent Adriansson	Sweden	25.93	44.6	10.20	11.92	66.72	Q
16	16	23	Thomas Burnyeat	Canada	28.40	44.7	10.28	8.48	63.46	Q
17	12	20	George Bobyn	Canada	24.49	41.6	7.60	13.92	63.12	
18	3	24	Baek Hyun-min	South Korea	26.42	42.6	8.62	11.24	62.46	
19	23	12	Linus Merz	Germany	24.06	37.9	8.19	14.52	60.61	
20	8	15	Trae Damore	United States	24.84	35.4	10.77	13.44	59.61	
21	10	22	Jacob Spalter	United States	26.38	34.7	11.00	11.29	56.99	
22	7	17	Jan Rubáček	Czech Republic	27.76	33.9	8.32	9.37	51.59	
23	14	21	Valentin Moritz	Germany	39.30	4.2	3.22	0.00	7.42	
	13	11	Alexander Mysko	Canada	DNF					

=== Final 1 ===
Rank	Order	Bib	Name	Country	Time	Score			Total	Notes
Rank	Order	Bib	Name	Country	Time	Turns	Air	Time	Total	Notes
1	16	2	Akseli Ahvenainen	Finland	22.71	48.5	15.66	16.40	80.56	Q
2	14	6	Shugo Kanno	Japan	21.51	43.0	15.14	18.07	76.21	Q
3	9	4	Quinn Dawson	Canada	23.61	46.2	12.42	15.15	73.77	Q
4	15	1	Shima Kawaoka	Japan	23.31	45.5	12.55	15.56	73.61	Q
5	8	16	Fyodor Bugakov	Kazakhstan	23.83	44.1	14.47	14.84	73.41	Q
6	11	5	Nicolas Weese	Germany	22.81	43.8	13.19	16.26	73.25	Q
7	10	3	Jackson Crockett	United States	24.11	44.8	13.57	14.45	72.82	
8	6	8	Anton Bondarev	Kazakhstan	24.04	43.9	13.46	14.55	71.91	
9	7	9	Aleksi Kaisla	Finland	23.63	44.8	11.84	15.12	71.76	
10	13	13	Antoine Tene	France	24.47	44.1	12.22	13.95	70.27	
11	2	14	Vincent Adriansson	Sweden	26.70	45.0	10.17	10.85	66.02	
12	3	7	Stephen Boone	United States	23.98	39.2	11.31	14.63	65.14	
13	1	23	Thomas Burnyeat	Canada	27.50	42.9	10.88	9.73	63.51	
14	4	18	Semyon Russakov	Kazakhstan	24.90	38.0	11.91	13.35	63.26	
15	5	19	Maxim Yemelyanov	Kazakhstan	24.59	37.4	11.59	13.78	62.77	
16	12	10	Marek Gajdečka	Czech Republic	22.14	35.2	9.91	17.19	62.30	

=== Final 2 ===
Rank	Order	Bib	Name	Country	Time	Score			Total	Notes
Rank	Order	Bib	Name	Country	Time	Turns	Air	Time	Total	Notes
1st place, gold medalist(s)	6	2	Akseli Ahvenainen	Finland	22.07	49.8	14.59	17.29	81.68	
2nd place, silver medalist(s)	5	6	Shugo Kanno	Japan	20.96	46.4	12.94	18.83	78.17	
3rd place, bronze medalist(s)	4	4	Quinn Dawson	Canada	23.10	48.6	12.89	15.86	77.35	
4	3	1	Shima Kawaoka	Japan	22.70	42.7	11.71	16.41	70.82	
5	2	16	Fyodor Bugakov	Kazakhstan	22.78	40.1	13.72	16.30	70.12	
6	1	5	Nicolas Weese	Germany	24.45	12.9	6.46	13.98	33.34	
