= Czech Republic at the 2025 Winter World University Games =

- Flag of Czech Republic
- IOC code: CZE

in Turin 13 January 2025 – 23 January 2025
- Competitors: 93 in 10 sports
- Flag bearers: Jakub Kocián, Alexandra Halounová
- Medals Ranked 20th: Gold 1 Silver 1 Bronze 3 Total 5

The Czech Republic competed at the 2025 Winter World University Games in Turin, Italy, from January 13 to January 23, 2025. This was the Czech Republic's seventeenth appearance at the FISU Winter World University Games, having competed at every Games since the dissolution of Czechoslovakia in 1993.

At the previous games, the team won 12 medals, the best result at the FISU Winter World University Games since 2013.

== Competitors ==
The following is the list of number of competitors (per gender) participating at the games per sport/discipline.

Sport	Men	Women	Total
Alpine skiing	5	4	9
Biathlon	4	4	8
Cross-country skiing	4	2	6
Figure skating	1	1	2
Freestyle skiing	5	1	6
Ice hockey	23	22	45
Short track speed skating	2	0	2
Ski orienteering	2	2	4
Ski mountaineering	3	1	4
Snowboarding	5	2	7
Total	54	39	93

Athlete	Date of birth	Sport	University	Sex
Luděk Abrahám	22 March 2002	Biathlon	Czech Technical University in Prague	M
Dominik Arnošt	11 April 2000	Ice hockey	University of South Bohemia in České Budějovice	M
Jakub Augsten	4 April 2001	Cross-country skiing	Masaryk University	M
Barbora Bartáková	24 January 2004	Ice hockey	Prague University of Economics and Business	F
Tomáš Bernat	20 August 2001	Ice hockey	Institute of Technology and Business in České Budějovice	M
Milan Breczko	24 March 2000	Ice hockey	Midland University	M
Natálie Brichová	1 February 2005	Ice hockey	Charles University	F
Viktorie Chladová	7 January 2003	Ice hockey	Czech University of Life Sciences Prague	F
Diana Cholenská	7 October 2003	Freestyle skiing	Charles University	F
Kryštof Choura	23 September 2000	Snowboarding	Institute of Technology and Business in České Budějovice	M
Samuel Chrenka	5 April 2003	Ice hockey	State University of New York at Fredonia	M
Barbora Dalecká	14 June 2005	Ice hockey	University of South Bohemia in České Budějovice	F
Marek Dvořák	11 July 2003	Ice hockey	Institute of Technology and Business in České Budějovice	M
Kateřina Dvořáková	18 August 2003	Ice hockey	Charles University	F
Lucie Eignerová	2 September 2003	Ice hockey	Charles University	F
Radek Fajkus	31 August 2001	Short track speed skating	Charles University	M
Eliška Fiedlerová	14 February 2004	Biathlon	Charles University	F
Marek Gajdečka	27 August 2004	Freestyle skiing	Brno University of Technology	M
Klára Gašparíková	15 May 2001	Alpine skiing	University of Economics and Management Prague	F
Iva Gieselová	20 March 2004	Ski mountaineering	University of Chemistry and Technology	F
Hana Haasová	7 August 2003	Ice hockey	Palacký University Olomouc	F
Denisa Habartová	23 February 2003	Ice hockey	St. Elizabeth College of Health and Social Work	F
Petr Hák	30 May 2003	Biathlon	Czech Technical University in Prague	M
Alexandra Halounová	26 April 2000	Ice hockey	University of West Bohemia	F
Sandra Halounová	26 April 2000	Ice hockey	University of West Bohemia	F
Tomáš Hanák	20 April 2002	Ice hockey	Palacký University Olomouc	M
Josef Hasman	19 August 2000	Ice hockey	Czech University of Life Sciences Prague	M
Ondřej Havlín	28 November 2000	Ice hockey	Charles University	M
Anežka Hlaváčová	24 September 2001	Ski orienteering	Masaryk University	F
Anežka Hračová	16 January 2004	Ice hockey	University of Ostrava	F
Sára Jedličková	7 November 2004	Alpine skiing	Newton University	F
David Jindra	11 March 2001	Ice hockey	Charles University	M
Marek Juřík	24 August 2004	Cross-country skiing	Masaryk University	M
Michal Kalista	5 March 2004	Ice hockey	Czech University of Life Sciences Prague	M
Tomáš Koblížek	26 January 2000	Ice hockey	Prague University of Economics and Business	M
Jakub Kocián	16 August 2000	Biathlon	College of Physical Education and Sport Palestra	M
Matěj Kolda	15 June 2000	Ice hockey	Czech University of Life Sciences Prague	M
Anna Kotounová	28 June 2001	Ice hockey	University of Defence	F
Jan Koula	31 December 2000	Alpine skiing	University of Hradec Králové	M
Marek Krčál	13 November 2004	Freestyle skiing	Czech Technical University in Prague	M
Vladimír Kremláček	24 September 2002	Ice hockey	University of West Bohemia	M
Štěpán Kroupa	12 April 2003	Alpine skiing	Prague University of Economics and Business	M
Adam Krupa	22 July 2004	Snowboarding	University of Ostrava	M
David Kubeš	26 March 2002	Alpine skiing	Prague University of Economics and Business	M
Vojtěch Kučera	4 March 2002	Alpine skiing	Anglo-American University	M
Martin Lašák	8 April 2000	Ice hockey	Brno University of Technology	M
David Lekeš	15 March 2000	Ice hockey	Palacký University Olomouc	M
Jakub Lomský	17 September 2003	Freestyle skiing	Czech Technical University in Prague	M
Joshua James Mácha	18 January 2002	Ice hockey	Palacký University Olomouc	M
Dominika Malicka	19 February 2005	Ice hockey	Palacký University Olomouc	F
Matyáš Martan	21 January 2004	Biathlon	Czech Technical University in Prague	M
Filip Matějovič	20 November 2002	Ski mountaineering	Charles University	M
Markéta Mazancová	11 August 2004	Ice hockey	University of South Bohemia in České Budějovice	F
Tereza Mazancová	15 September 2002	Ice hockey	Škoda Auto University	F
Svatava Mikysková	8 February 2003	Biathlon	Masaryk University	F
Marek Müller	3 May 2004	Alpine skiing	Charles University	M
Tomáš Müller	20 January 2001	Ice hockey	Westfield State University	M
Josef Nagy	29 September 2004	Ski orienteering	Czech Technical University in Prague	M
Adam Nedelka	31 March 2002	Ice hockey	Ambis University	M
Adéla Nováková	8 March 2000	Cross-country skiing	University of West Bohemia	F
Barbora Nováková	6 January 2002	Alpine skiing	Newton University	F
Aneta Novotná	25 February 2005	Biathlon	College of Polytechnics Jihlava	F
Veronika Novotná	26 November 2002	Biathlon	Masaryk University	F
Matyáš Pávek	22 October 2004	Cross-country skiing	University of Alaska Fairbanks	M
Tereza Pecková	22 January 2005	Ski orienteering	Czech University of Life Sciences Prague	F
Julie Pejšová	3 February 2003	Ice hockey	High School Czech Union of Sports	F
Josef Petřek	5 August 2002	Freestyle skiing	VSB – Technical University of Ostrava	M
Kateřina Petřeková	14 August 2002	Ice hockey	Palacký University Olomouc	F
Jiří Remta	16 December 2002	Ice hockey	Institute of Technology and Business in České Budějovice	M
Jan Rubáček	20 November 2004	Freestyle skiing	Brno University of Technology	M
Kristián Salač	31 December 2001	Snowboarding	College of Physical Education and Sport Palestra	M
Zdeněk Sejpal	26 April 2001	Short track speed skating	Czech University of Life Sciences Prague	M
Adam Sojka	3 October 2003	Ice hockey	Niagara University	M
Michal Strejc	15 July 2002	Ski mountaineering	Charles University	M
Sára Strnadová	30 September 2002	Snowboarding	Czech Technical University in Prague	F
Martin Svoboda	7 July 2005	Cross-country skiing	Charles University	M
Filip Ščerba	6 September 2001	Figure skating	Charles University	M
Jan Škorpík	24 February 2001	Ice hockey	University of Wisconsin–Superior	M
Patricie Škorpíková	10 May 2002	Ice hockey	Palacký University Olomouc	F
Klára Šonková	4 January 2003	Snowboarding	Ambis University	F
Marek Štěrba	22 September 2004	Ski orienteering	Czech Technical University in Prague	M
Jakub Švec	28 May 2001	Ski mountaineering	Technical University of Liberec	M
Bruno Tatarko	24 July 2003	Snowboarding	Stockholm University	M
Linda Trejbalová	26 November 2003	Alpine skiing	Newton University	F
Vojtěch Trojan	5 July 2005	Snowboarding	University of Amsterdam	M
Lucie Tůmová	4 January 2005	Cross-country skiing	Jan Evangelista Purkyně University in Ústí nad Labem	F
Matyáš Turinský	21 November 2004	Snowboarding	Institute of Technology and Business in České Budějovice	M
Anna Václavková	1 December 2003	Ice hockey	University of Veterinary Sciences Brno	F
Eliška Vaněčková	3 July 2003	Ice hockey	VSB – Technical University of Ostrava	F
Anna Vaníčková	23 December 2005	Ice hockey	University of West Bohemia	F
Patrik Vašíček	17 January 2000	Ice hockey	Newton University	M
Michaela Vrašťáková	21 July 2005	Figure skating	Palacký University Olomouc	F
Adéla Wojnarová	27 June 2005	Ice hockey	VSB – Technical University of Ostrava	F
Tomáš Zeman	27 April 2001	Ice hockey	Vyšší odborná škola a střední pedagogická škola Litomyšl	M

== Medalists ==
Medal	Name	Sport	Event	Date
Bronze	Petr Hák	Biathlon	Men's short individual	14 January
Silver	Petr Hák, Svatava Mikysková	Biathlon	Single mixed relay	16 January
Bronze	Marek Krčál	Freestyle skiing	Men's big air	19 January
Bronze	Josef Nagy	Ski orienteering	Men's sprint	19 January
Gold	Women's ice hockey team	Ice hockey	Women	20 January

== Alpine skiing ==
Men

Athlete	Event	Run 1		Run 2		Total	
Athlete	Event	Time	Rank	Time	Rank	Time	Rank
Jan Koula	Combined	59.17	6	43.10	30	1:42.27	22
Jan Koula	Super-G	—N/a				DNF	
Jan Koula	Giant Slalom	1:01.67	9	1:02.66	4	2:04.33	4
David Kubeš	Combined	59.18	7	42.73	23	1:41.91	15
David Kubeš	Super-G	—N/a				58.57	7
David Kubeš	Giant Slalom	1:02.58	21	1:04.44	31	2:07.02	28
Štěpán Kroupa	Combined	1:00.12	22	42.07	11	1:42.19	18
Štěpán Kroupa	Super-G	—N/a				59.93	24
Štěpán Kroupa	Giant Slalom	1:03.20	32	1:05.45	45	2:08.65	38
Štěpán Kroupa	Slalom	DNF				DNF	
Marek Müller	Combined	1:00.09	20	42.18	31	1:46.19	40
Marek Müller	Super-G	—N/a				59.33	16
Marek Müller	Giant Slalom	1:02.81	26	1:03.48	16	2:06.29	22
Marek Müller	Slalom	42.91	27	40.85	21	1:23.76	24
Vojtěch Kučera	Combined	1:01.64	37	44.55	43	1:46.19	40
Vojtěch Kučera	Super-G	—N/a				1:00.63	30
Vojtěch Kučera	Giant Slalom	DNF		—N/a		DNF	

Women

Athlete	Event	Run 1		Run 2		Total	
Athlete	Event	Time	Rank	Time	Rank	Time	Rank
Klára Gašpaříková	Giant Slalom	1:06.85	27	1:04.69	12	2:11.54	24
Klára Gašpaříková	Slalom	DNF		—N/a		DNF	
Barbora Nováková	Combined	1:00.65	4	53.91	18	1:54.56	8
Barbora Nováková	Super-G	—N/a				DNF	
Barbora Nováková	Giant Slalom	1:05.37	14	1:04.71	13	2:10.08	11
Linda Trejbalová	Combined	DNF		—N/a		DNF	
Linda Trejbalová	Super-G	—N/a				DNF	
Linda Trejbalová	Giant Slalom	1:04.98	11	1:05.39	22	2:10.37	14
Linda Trejbalová	Slalom	41.12	23	40.31	28	1:21.43	25
Sára Jedličková	Combined	1:04.01	21	DNF		DNF	
Sára Jedličková	Super-G	—N/a				1:05.18	17
Sára Jedličková	Giant Slalom	DNF		—N/a		DNF	
Sára Jedličková	Slalom	DNF		—N/a		DNF	

Mixed

Athlete	Event	1/8 finals	Quarterfinals	Semifinals	Final / BM	Rank
Athlete	Event	Opposition Result				Rank
Linda Trejbalová; Marek Müller; Barbora Nováková; David Kubeš	Mixed team parallel	Canada; W 3–1	Sweden; L 1–3	did not advance		5

== Biathlon ==
Men

Athlete	Event	Time	Misses	Rank
Jakub Kocián	Short individual	41:34.0	2 (0+1+0+1)	13
Jakub Kocián	Sprint	DNS		
Luděk Abraham	Short individual	40:57.5	4 (0+1+1+2)	9
Luděk Abraham	Sprint	24:28.3	3 (2+1)	12
Luděk Abraham	Pursuit	41:30.6	9 (2+3+2+2)	16
Luděk Abraham	Mass start	43:46.9	4 (0+0+2+2)	5
Petr Hák	Short individual	39:10.1	2 (1+1+1+0)	3rd place, bronze medalist(s)
Petr Hák	Sprint	24:05.8	1 (1+0)	8
Matyáš Martan	Short individual	42:04.4	5 (2+0+0+3)	18
Matyáš Martan	Sprint	25:07.2	2 (0+2)	17
Matyáš Martan	Pursuit	41:29.5	5 (1+1+2+1)	15
Matyáš Martan	Mass start	43:32.1	2 (0+2+0+0)	4

Women

Athlete	Event	Time	Misses	Rank
Veronika Novotná	Short individual	41:58.2	4 (1+1+0+4)	16
Veronika Novotná	Sprint	26:40.0	6 (3+3)	32
Veronika Novotná	Pursuit	43:49.2	4 (0+2+1+1)	23
Veronika Novotná	Mass start	46:58.9	6 (1+0+1+4)	19
Eliška Fiedlerová	Short individual	42:12.6	4 (0+0+1+3)	18
Eliška Fiedlerová	Sprint	26:22.5	4 (4+0)	30
Eliška Fiedlerová	Pursuit	45:08.9	4 (1+0+2+1)	27
Eliška Fiedlerová	Mass start	50:55.3	6 (4+0+2+0)	28
Aneta Novotná	Short individual	41:07.8	3 (1+1+0+1)	15
Aneta Novotná	Sprint	27:12.9	7 (3+4)	37
Aneta Novotná	Pursuit	45:38.9	6 (2+0+2+2)	28
Aneta Novotná	Mass start	46:01,9	4 (0+2+1+1)	16
Svatava Mikysková	Short individual	43:20.5	6 (1+3+0+2)	20
Svatava Mikysková	Sprint	25:18.1	3 (1+2)	20
Svatava Mikysková	Pursuit	44:40:0	8 (2+2+2+2)	24
Svatava Mikysková	Mass start	44:45.5	2 (0+0+0+2)	10

Mixed

Athletes	Event	Time	Misses	Rank
Petr Hák, Svatava Mikysková	Single mixed relay	40:09.2	1+4	2nd place, silver medalist(s)

== Cross-country skiing ==
Men

Athlete	Event	Qualification		Quarterfinal		Semifinal		Final	
Athlete	Event	Time	Rank	Time	Rank	Time	Rank	Time	Rank
Jakub Augsten	10 km freestyle	—N/a						25:41.9	35
Jakub Augsten	Sprint classic	3:59.58	87	did not advance					87
Jakub Augsten	20 km classic	—N/a						1:01:37.7	32
Marek Juřík	10 km freestyle	—N/a						25:53.5	39
Marek Juřík	Sprint classic	3:13.10	34	did not advance					34
Marek Juřík	20 km classic	—N/a						1:03:16.5	40
Matyáš Pávek	10 km freestyle	—N/a						25:33.7	28
Matyáš Pávek	Sprint classic	3:15.05	44	did not advance					44
Matyáš Pávek	20 km classic	—N/a						1:03:03.1	39
Martin Svoboda	10 km freestyle	—N/a						25:33.8	29
Martin Svoboda	Sprint classic	3:08.25	18	3:13.49	5	did not advance			24
Martin Svoboda	20 km classic	—N/a						1:00:14.5	26
Martin Svoboda; Matyáš Pávek; Marek Juřík; Jakub Augsten	4×7.5 km relay	—N/a						1:14:35.8	9

Women

Athlete	Event	Qualification		Quarterfinal		Semifinal		Final	
Athlete	Event	Time	Rank	Time	Rank	Time	Rank	Time	Rank
Adéla Nováková	10 km freestyle	—N/a						29:08.5	11
Adéla Nováková	Sprint classic	3:38.41	11	3:32.69	2	3:33.63	3	DNA	7
Lucie Tůmová	10 km freestyle	—N/a						DNS	
Lucie Tůmová	Sprint classic	3:37.90	9	3:29.72	2	3:30.69	2	3:48.59	6

Mixed

Athlete	Event	Qualification				Final	
Athlete	Event	Time	Rank	Total time	Rank	Time	Rank
Adéla Nováková	Mixed team sprint free	3:53.60	8	7:10.66	7	23:32.19	11
Jakub Augsten	Mixed team sprint free	3:17.06	9	7:10.66	7	23:32.19	11
Lucie Tůmová	Mixed team sprint free	3:57.85	12	7:26.68	16	did not advance	
Marek Juřík	Mixed team sprint free	3:29.01	23	7:26.68	16	did not advance	

== Figure skating ==
Athletes	Event	SP		FS		Total	
Athletes	Event	Points	Rank	Points	Rank	Points	Rank
Filip Ščerba	Men	55.77	24	114.19	17	169.96	20
Michaela Vrašťáková	Women	44.18	18	90.24	18	134.42	18

== Freestyle skiing ==
Ski cross

Athlete	Event	Seeding run		Panel heats			Semifinal	Final	Final rank
Athlete	Event	Time	Rank	Heat ranks	Points	Rank	Position	Position	Final rank
Jakub Lomský	Men's ski cross	34.65	13	1-2-2-1-3	16	4	3	DNF	7

Moguls

Athlete	Event	Pre-heats	Heats		Qualification		Final 1		Semifinal	Final	
Athlete	Event		Points	Rank	Score	Rank	Score	Rank		Score	Rank
Marek Gajdečka	Men's moguls	—N/a			74.40	4	62.30	16	—N/a	DNA	16
Marek Gajdečka	Men's dual moguls	—N/a	10	3	—N/a				did not advance		10
Jan Rubáček	Men's moguls	—N/a			51.59	22	did not advance		—N/a	DNA	22
Jan Rubáček	Men's dual moguls	George Bobyn (CAN); L 7–18	did not advance		—N/a				did not advance		21

Slopestyle & Big Air

Athlete	Event	Qualification				Final				
Athlete	Event	Run 1	Run 2	Best	Rank	Run 1	Run 2	Run 3	Total	Rank
Marek Krčál	Men's slopestyle	39.50	63.50	63.50	9	16.75	31.00	—N/a	31.00	12
Marek Krčál	Men's big air	70.50	DNI	70.50	8	37.25	84.00	CAN	84.00	3rd place, bronze medalist(s)

== Ice hockey ==
=== Men's tournament ===
Team	Event	Group stage					Quarterfinal	Semifinal	Final (5th–6th place)	
Team	Event	Opponent Score				Rank	Opponent Score			Rank
Czech Republic men's team	Men	Canada; W 2–1 GWS	Sweden; W 3–2	South Korea; W 5–1	Kazakhstan; W 3–1	1	Ukraine; L 3–4 OT	—N/a	Kazakhstan; L 2–5	6

Roster

- Goalkeepers: 1 Jan Škorpík, 2 Michal Kalista, 3 Marek Dvořák
- Defenders: 4 Martin Lašák, 6 Patrik Vašíček, 7 Tomáš Müller, 9 Jiří Remta, 12 Ondřej Havlín, 14 Adam Nedelka, 16 Vladimír Kremláček, 24 Tomáš Hanák
- Forwards: 8 Josef Hasman, 10 Tomáš Bernat, 11 Milan Breczko, 13 Matěj Kolda, 15 Joshua James Mácha, 18 Tomáš Zeman, 19 David Lekeš, 20 Tomáš Koblížek, 21 Adam Sojka, 22 David Jindra, 23 Samuel Chrenka, 25 Dominik Arnošt
- Coach: Jaroslav Liška, Oldřich Kališ

=== Women's tournament ===
Team	Event	Group stage				Semifinal	Final / BR	
Team	Event	Opponent Score			Rank	Opponent Score		Rank
Czech Republic women's team	Women	United States; W 6–3	Kazakhstan; W 11–1	Japan; W 4–0	1	Slovakia; W 3–1	Canada; W 2–1 OT	1st place, gold medalist(s)

Roster

- Goalkeepers: 1 Kateřina Dvořáková, 30 Barbora Dalecká, 32 Julie Pejšová
- Defenders: 6 Anna Vaníčková, 18 Viktorie Chladová, 23 Anna Kotounová, 24 Adéla Wojnarová, 31 Anežka Hračová, 49 Denisa Habartová, 71 Eliška Vaněčková
- Forwards: 4 Anna Václavková, 5 Lucie Eignerová, 9 Sandra Halounová, 11 Alexandra Halounová, 16 Markéta Mazancová, 17 Dominika Malicka, 28 Kateřina Petřeková, 66 Natálie Brichová, 73 Hana Haasová, 84 Barbora Bartáková, 88 Patricie Škorpíková, 99 Tereza Mazancová
- Coach: Jan Lucák

== Short track speed skating ==
Men

Athlete	Event	Pre-heats		Heats		Quarterfinal		Semifinal		Final B		Final		Final rank
Athlete	Event	Time	Rank	Time	Time	Time	Rank	Time	Rank	Time	Rank	Time	Rank	Final rank
Radek Fajkus	500 m	42.625	2	42.395	3	42.389	4	did not advance						14
Radek Fajkus	1000 m	1:33.671	1	1:31.177	3	1:33.263	5	did not advance						17
Radek Fajkus	1500 m	—N/a				2:28.419	2	2:21:140	3	3:36.781	7	did not advance		14
Zdeněk Sejpal	500 m	43.046	3	43.305	5	did not advance								27
Zdeněk Sejpal	1000 m	1:26.891	3	1:30.597	5	did not advance								25
Zdeněk Sejpal	1500 m	—N/a				2:32.528	3	did not advance						23

== Ski mountaineering ==
Athlete	Event	Qualification		Quarterfinal		Semifinal		Final	
Athlete	Event	Time	Rank	Time	Rank	Time	Rank	Time	Rank
Filip Matějovič	Men's sprint	4:35.88	10	4:26.26	2	4:36.07	5	DNA	10
Filip Matějovič	Men's vertical race	—N/a						15:00.5	13
Michal Strejc	Men's sprint	4:56.44	25	4:58.38	5	DNA			23
Michal Strejc	Men's vertical race	—N/a						DNS	
Jakub Švec	Men's sprint	5:14.35	28	5:14.20	6	DNA			27
Jakub Švec	Men's vertical race	—N/a						DNS	
Iva Gieselová	Women's sprint	DNS		—N/a					
Iva Gieselová	Women's vertical race	—N/a						DNS	

== Ski orienteering ==
Athlete	Event	Time	Rank
Josef Nagy	Men's sprint	13:03	3rd place, bronze medalist(s)
Marek Štěrba	Men's sprint	14:54	19
Anežka Hlaváčová	Women's sprint	14:51	15
Tereza Pecková	Women's sprint	14:20	8
Tereza Pecková; Josef Nagy	Mixed Sprint Relay	46:48	6
Anežka Hlaváčová; Marek Štěrba	Mixed Sprint Relay	47:52	8

== Snowboarding ==
Snowboard cross

Athlete	Event	Seeding		Round Robin		Semifinal	Final	Final Rank
Athlete	Event	Time	Rank	Points	Position	Position	Position	Final Rank
Matyáš Turinský	Men's snowboard cross	32.53	14	13	7	Did not advance		10
Vojtěch Trojan	Men's snowboard cross	32.65	17	17	5	Did not advance		14
Kryštof Choura	Men's snowboard cross	Did not start						
Sára Strnadová	Women's snowboard cross	Did not start						

Halfpipe, Slopestyle & Big Air

Athlete	Event	Qualification				Final				
Athlete	Event	Run 1	Run 2	Best	Rank	Run 1	Run 2	Run 3	Total	Rank
Kristián Salač	Men's slopestyle	81.75	DNI	81.75	5	26.50	31.00	—N/a	31.00	12
Kristián Salač	Men's big air	80.75	90.25	90.25	3	21.50	DNI	CAN	21.50	11

Parallel Giant Slalom

Athlete	Event	Qualification		1/8 Finals	Quarterfinals	Semifinal	Final	Final Rank
Athlete	Event	Time	Rank	1/8 Finals	Quarterfinals	Semifinal	Final	Final Rank
Adam Krupa	Men's parallel giant slalom	1:16.84	21	did not advance				21
Adam Krupa	Men's parallel slalom	1:20.16	17	did not advance				17
Klára Šonková	Women's parallel giant slalom	1:15.00	3	Natalia Stokłasa (POL); W -3.34	Sonia Zapała (POL); L +0.11	did not advance		5
Klára Šonková	Women's parallel slalom	1:22.10	7	Hinano Oshima (JPN); L +0.52	did not advance			9

== See also ==
- Czech Republic at the 2023 Winter World University Games
- Czech Republic at the 2025 Summer World University Games
