= Snowboarding at the 2025 Winter World University Games – Women's snowboard cross =

Snowboarding event at the 2025 Winter World University Games

Women's snowboard cross at the Torino 2025 FISU World University Games
- Snowboarding
- Venue: Bardonecchia
- Date: 12 January (seeding); 13 & 14 January (elimination round)
- Competitors: 15 from 10 nations

Medalists
1st place, gold medalist(s)		Camille Poulat	France
2nd place, silver medalist(s)		Margaux Herpin	France
3rd place, bronze medalist(s)		Marika Savoldelli	Italy

The women's snowboard cross competition in snowboarding at the 2025 Winter World University Games will be held on 12–14 January at Bardonecchia.

== Results ==
=== Seeding run ===
The seeding run will be held on 12 January at 12:30.

Rank	Bib	Name	Country	Time	Notes
1	7	Margaux Herpin	France	33.72	Q
2	3	Zoé Colombier	France	33.74	Q
3	4	Camille Poulat	France	34.04	Q
4	10	Remi Yoshida	Japan	34.49	Q
5	2	Marika Savoldelli	Italy	34.52	Q
6	11	Katarína Pitoňáková	Slovakia	34.71	Q
7	6	Sofia Groblechner	Italy	35.16	Q
8	8	Woo Su-been	South Korea	36.11	Q
9	5	Lara Walsh	Australia	36.19	Q
10	9	Sára Pitoňáková	Slovakia	36.41	Q
11	13	Andrea Seijas	Spain	37.47	Q
12	15	Cayman Chen	United States	49.30	Q
13	12	Kaitlyn McQuiggin	Canada	53.16	Q
14	14	Ella Thunen	United States	1:07.68	Q
	1	Sára Strnadová	Czech Republic	DNS	

=== Round Robin ===
Rank	Name	Country	Heats																				Points	Notes
Rank	Name	Country	1	2	3	4	5	6	7	8	9	10	11	12	13	14	15	16	17	18	19	20	Points	Notes
1	Margaux Herpin	France	4				4				4				4				4				20	Q
2	Camille Poulat	France	3						4				4				4				4		19	Q
3	Zoé Colombier	France	2					4				4				4				4			18	Q
4	Marika Savoldelli	Italy		4			3					3					3					4	17	Q
5	Sofia Groblechner	Italy		3					3					4	3					3			16	Q
6	Katarína Pitoňáková	Slovakia		2				3			3							4			3		15	Q
7	Lara Walsh	Australia			4		2						3					3		2			14	Q
8	Remi Yoshida	Japan	1							4				3				2				3	13	Q
9	Sára Pitoňáková	Slovakia			3			2						2			2		3				12	
10	Woo Su-been	South Korea		1						3			2			3			2				11	
11	Andrea Seijas	Spain			2				2		2					2						2	10	
12	Kaitlyn McQuiggin	Canada				4	1							1		1					2		9	
13	Cayman Chen	United States			1					2		2			2						1		8	
14	Ella Thunen	United States				3		1					1		1							1	7	

=== Elimination round ===
==== Semi-finals ====
Heat 1

Rank	Bib	Name	Country	Notes
1	1	Margaux Herpin	France	Q
2	4	Marika Savoldelli	Italy	Q
3	5	Sofia Groblechner	Italy	
4	8	Remi Yoshida	Japan	DNF

Heat 2

Rank	Bib	Name	Country	Notes
1	3	Zoé Colombier	France	Q
2	2	Camille Poulet	France	Q
3	7	Lara Walsh	Australia	
4	6	Katarína Pitoňáková	Slovakia	DNF

==== Finals ====
Small final

Rank	Bib	Name	Country	Notes
5	5	Sofia Groblechner	Italy	
6	6	Katarína Pitoňáková	Slovakia	
7	7	Lara Walsh	Australia	
8	8	Remi Yoshida	Japan	DNS

Big final

Rank	Bib	Name	Country	Notes
1st place, gold medalist(s)	2	Camille Poulet	France	
2nd place, silver medalist(s)	1	Margaux Herpin	France	
3rd place, bronze medalist(s)	4	Marika Savoldelli	Italy	
4	3	Zoé Colombier	France	DNF
