= Snowboarding at the 2025 Winter World University Games – Men's snowboard cross =

Snowboarding event at the 2025 Winter World University Games

Men's snowboard cross at the Torino 2025 FISU World University Games
- Snowboarding
- Venue: Bardonecchia
- Date: 12 January (seeding); 13 & 14 January (elimination round)
- Competitors: 28 from 10 nations

Medalists
1st place, gold medalist(s)		Quentin Sodogas	France
2nd place, silver medalist(s)		Bernat Ribera	Spain
3rd place, bronze medalist(s)		Umito Kirchwehm	Germany

The men's snowboard cross competition in snowboarding at the 2025 Winter World University Games will be held on 12–14 January at Bardonecchia.

== Results ==
=== Seeding run ===
The seeding run will be held on 12 January at 12:50.

Rank	Bib	Name	Country	Time	Notes
1	13	Guillaume Herpin	France	31.02	Q
2	12	Quentin Sodogas	France	31.11	Q
3	9	Bernat Ribera	Spain	31.50	Q
4	2	Kenshin Kiyota	Japan	31.69	Q
5	15	Matteo Rezzoli	Italy	31.85	Q
6	11	Titouan Cottret	France	31.88	Q
7	14	Noah Royz	Canada	31.90	Q
8	10	Umito Kirchwehm	Germany	31.93	Q
9	1	Kota Sakurai	Japan	32.25	Q
10	23	Shunsuka Kawamura	Japan	32.32	Q
11	21	Max Vardy	Australia	32.37	Q
12	6	Federico Podda	Italy	32.44	Q
13	17	Tommaso Costa	Italy	32.52	Q
14	4	Matyáš Turinský	Czech Republic	32.53	Q
15	19	Ivan Malovannyi	Ukraine	32.54	Q
16	20	Giovanni di Mola	Italy	32.61	Q
17	22	Vojtěch Trojan	Czech Republic	32.65	Q
18	5	Fillip Freudenberg	Germany	32.71	Q
19	3	Antoni Toledo	Spain	32.71	Q
20	16	Yuto Tsukahara	Japan	33.41	Q
21	27	Moritz Metzger	Germany	33.42	Q
22	25	Leon Davis-Cook	Australia	34.93	Q
23	24	Joel Bradford	Australia	35.23	Q
24	18	Oscar Sayers	Australia	35.30	Q
25	28	Márkó Marosvölgyi	Hungary	38.10	Q
26	26	Glib Mostovenko	Ukraine	53.32	Q
	7	Niels Conradt	Germany	DNF	Q
	8	Kryštof Choura	Czech Republic	DNS	

=== Round Robin ===
==== Group 1 ====
Rank	Name	Country	Heats																				Points	Notes
Rank	Name	Country	1	2	3	4	5	6	7	8	9	10	11	12	13	14	15	16	17	18	19	20	Points	Notes
1	Guillaume Herpin	France	4				4				4				4				4				20	Q
2	Umito Kirchwehm	Germany	3							4				4				4				4	19	Q
3	Matteo Rezzoli	Italy	2						4				4				4				4		18	Q
4	Kenshin Kiyota	Japan	1					4				4				4				4			17	Q
5	Kota Sakurai	Japan		4			3					3					3					2	15	
6	Federico Podda	Italy		3				3			3							3			3		15	
7	Vojtěch Trojan	Czech Republic			4		2						3					2		2			13	
8	Giovanni di Mola	Italy		2						3			2			3			3				13	
9	Yuto Tsukahara	Japan			3			2						3			2		2				12	
10	Tommaso Costa	Italy		1					3					2	3					3			12	
11	Oscar Sayers	Australia			2					2		2			2						2		10	
12	Moritz Metzger	Germany			1				2		2					2						3	10	
13	Márkó Marosvölgyi	Hungary				4	1							1		1					1		8	

==== Group 2 ====
Rank	Name	Country	Heats																				Points	Notes
Rank	Name	Country	1	2	3	4	5	6	7	8	9	10	11	12	13	14	15	16	17	18	19	20	Points	Notes
1	Bernat Ribera	Spain	4					4				4				4				4			20	Q
2	Quentin Sodogas	France	1				4				4				4				4				17	Q
3	Titouan Cottret	France	2						4				4				4				3		17	Q
4	Noah Royz	Canada	3							4				3				3				4	17	Q
5	Matyáš Turinský	Czech Republic		4					3					4	3					3			17	
6	Max Vardy	Australia		2				3			3							4			4		16	
7	Ivan Malovannyi	Ukraine		3						3			3			3			2				14	
8	Fillip Freudenberg	Germany			4		3						2					2		2			13	
9	Antoni Toledo	Spain			3			1						2			3		3				12	
10	Shunsuke Kawamura	Japan		1			2					2					2					3	10	
11	Leon Davis-Cook	Australia			2				2		2					2						2	10	
12	Niels Conradt	Germany				4		2					1		2							0	9	
13	Glib Mostovenko	Ukraine				3	1							1		1					2		8	
14	Joel Bradford	Australia			1					2		3			1						1		8	

=== Elimination round ===
==== Semi-finals ====
Heat 1

Rank	Bib	Name	Country	Notes
1	4	Quentin Sodogas	France	Q
2	1	Guillaume Herpin	France	Q
3	5	Titouan Cottret	France	
4	8	Kenshin Kiyota	Japan	

Heat 2

Rank	Bib	Name	Country	Notes
1	2	Bernat Ribera	Spain	Q
2	3	Umito Kirchwehm	Germany	Q
3	6	Matteo Razzoli	Italy	DNF
4	7	Noah Royz	Canada	DNF

==== Finals ====
Small final

Rank	Bib	Name	Country	Notes
5	8	Kenshin Kiyota	Japan	
6	5	Titouan Cottret	France	
7	7	Noah Royz	Canada	
8	6	Matteo Razzoli	Italy	DNF

Big final

Rank	Bib	Name	Country	Notes
1st place, gold medalist(s)	4	Quentin Sodogas	France	
2nd place, silver medalist(s)	2	Bernat Ribera	Spain	
3rd place, bronze medalist(s)	3	Umito Kirchwehm	Germany	
4	1	Guillaume Herpin	France	DNF
