= Armenia at the 2025 Winter World University Games =

- IOC code: ARM
- NOC: Armenian Student Sports Federation

in Turin, Italy 13 January 2025 – 23 January 2025
- Competitors: 9 (8 men and 1 woman) in 5 sports
- Flag bearers: Norik Tadevosyan (snowboarding); Garik Melkonyan (para-cross-country skiing)
- Medals Ranked 26th: Gold 0 Silver 0 Bronze 1 Total 1

Winter Universiade appearances
- 1960; 1962; 1964; 1966; 1968; 1972; 1978; 1981; 1983; 1985; 1987; 1989; 1991; 1993; 1995; 1997; 1999; 2001; 2003; 2005; 2007; 2009; 2011; 2013; 2015; 2017; 2019; 2023; 2025

Armenia competed at the 2025 Winter World University Games in Turin, Italy, from 13 to 23 January 2025.

== Medalists ==
Armenia finished on the twenty-sixth place in the medal table with one medal.

Medal	Name	Sport	Event	Date
Bronze	Garik Melkonyan	Para-cross-country skiing	Men's 10 km free technique standing	15 January

== Competitors ==
At the 2025 Winter World University Games was participated 9 athletes. Norik Tadevosyan (snowboarding) and Garik Melkonyan (para-cross-country skiing) were a flag bearers at the opening ceremony

Sport	Men	Women	Total
Alpine skiing	2	0	2
Cross-country skiing	1	0	1
Figure skating	2	1	3
Para-cross-country skiing	1	0	1
Snowboarding	2	0	2
Total	8	1	9
