= Cross-country skiing at the 2025 Winter World University Games =

Alpine skiing competition

Cross-country skiing at the Torino 2025 FISU World University Games
- Cross-country skiing pictogram
- Venue: Pragelato Plan
- Dates: 15–23 January 2025
- Competitors: 198 from 28 nations

Cross-country skiing and Para-cross-country skiing at the 2025 Winter World University Games was held at Pragelato Plan from 15 to 23 January 2025.

== Cross-country skiing ==
=== Men's events ===
Event	Gold		Silver		Bronze	
10 kilometre freestyle	Olaf Talmo; Norway	24:21.0	Nico Bennert; Finland	24:27.8	Mario Matikainov; Bulgaria	24:38.2
20 kilometre classical mass start	Markus Kasanen; Finland	56:08.7	Daito Yamazaki; Japan	56:17.7	Nico Bennert; Finland	56:21.4
4 × 7.5 kilometre relay	Japan; Sho Kasahara; Ikuya Takizawa; Daito Yamazaki; Kanta Sakai	1:08:45.9	Switzerland; Nolan Gertsch; Silvan Durrer; Maxime Béguin; Jan Fässler	1:09:06.8	Finland; Topias Kemppi; Markus Kasanen; Eelis Valikainen; Nico Bennert	1:09:20.9
Sprint classical	Nolan Gertsch; Switzerland	3:02.98	Valtteri Pennanen; Finland	3:03.74	Markus Kasanen; Finland	3:04.16

=== Women's events ===
Event	Gold		Silver		Bronze	
10 kilometre freestyle	Izabela Marcisz; Poland	28:08.7	Maria Eugenia Boccardi; Italy	28:11.6	Carla Wohler; Switzerland	28:23.2
20 kilometre classical mass start	Keidy Kaasiku; Estonia	1:03:49.4	Kaidy Kaasiku; Estonia	1:04:07.2	Izabela Marcisz; Poland	1:04:47.6
4 × 7.5 kilometre relay	Finland; Hanna Ray; Elsa Torvinen; Iida Vuollet; Anni Lindroos	1:20:57.0	Japan; Chika Honda; Takane Tochitani; Karen Hatakeyama; Kaha Nakajima	1:21:28.2	France; Félicie Chappaz; Manon Favre Bonvin; Julie Marciniak; France Pignot	1:22:03.5
Sprint classical	Izabela Marcisz; Poland	3:35.06	Kaidy Kaasiku; Estonia	3:35.42	Anni Lindroos; Finland	3:35.80

=== Mixed events ===
Event	Gold		Silver		Bronze	
Team sprint freestyle	Germany; Marius Bauer; Miriam Reisnecker	22:46.41	France; Hugo Serot; Félicie Chappaz	22:49.36	Poland; Łukasz Gazurek; Izabela Marcisz	22:51.50

== Para-cross-country skiing ==
=== Men's events ===
Event	Class	Gold		Silver		Bronze	
Sprint classical	Visually impaired	Inkki Inola; Guide: Reetu Inkilä; Finland	3:31.1	Lennart Volkert; Guide: Nils Kolb; Germany	3:43.3	Roman Kurbanov; Guide: Anton Zhdanovich; Kazakhstan	4:40.9
Sprint classical	Standing	Marco Maier; Germany	4:10.0	Denis Zinov; Kazakhstan	4:30.5	Charles Lecours; Canada	4:49.6
10 kilometre freestyle	Visually impaired	Inkki Inola; Guide: Reetu Inkilä; Finland	22:51.4	Lennart Volkert; Guide: Nils Kolb; Germany	24:17.1	Roman Kurbanov; Guide: Anton Zhdanovich; Kazakhstan	28:17.1
10 kilometre freestyle	Standing	Marco Maier; Germany	22:37.3	Denis Zinov; Kazakhstan	26:02.6	Garik Melkonyan; Armenia	26:28.6

=== Women events ===
Event	Class	Gold		Silver		Bronze	
Sprint classical	Visually impaired	Leonie Walter; Guide: Christian Krasman; Germany	4:40.3	Johanna Recktenwald; Guide: Emily Weiß; Germany	5:09.1	Aneta Kobryń; Guide: Katarzyna Witek; Poland	5:27.1
10 kilometre freestyle	Visually impaired	Leonie Walter; Guide: Emily Weiß; Germany	25:37.9	Johanna Recktenwald; Guide: Christian Krasman; Germany	26:50.8	Aneta Kobryń; Guide: Katarzyna Witek; Poland	31:46.3

== Medal table ==
* Host nation (Italy)

Rank	Nation	Gold	Silver	Bronze	Total
1	Germany	5	4	0	9
2	Finland	4	2	4	10
3	Poland	2	0	4	6
4	Estonia	1	2	0	3
4	Japan	1	2	0	3
6	Switzerland	1	1	1	3
7	Norway	1	0	0	1
8	Kazakhstan	0	2	2	4
9	France	0	1	1	2
10	Italy*	0	1	0	1
11	Armenia	0	0	1	1
11	Bulgaria	0	0	1	1
11	Canada	0	0	1	1
Totals (13 entries)		15	15	15	45

== Participating nations ==
=== Cross-country skiing ===
- Argentina (1)
- Armenia (2)
- Australia (7)
- Austria (3)
- Bulgaria (3)
- Canada (17)
- Chile (2)
- China (8)
- Croatia (1)
- Czech Republic (6)
- Estonia (4)
- Finland (15)
- France (8)
- Germany (10) (Hosts)
- Great Britain (4)
- Italy (8)
- Japan (9)
- Kazakhstan (14)
- Mongolia (3)
- Norway (11)
- Poland (11)
- Slovakia (3)
- Slovenia (5)
- Switzerland (11)
- South Korea (7)
- Thailand (2)
- Turkey (8)
- United States (12)
