= Newton University =

University in Baltimore, Maryland (1845–1859)

Newton University was a university in Baltimore, Maryland that was given a charter by the state of Maryland in 1845. It had a 77-member self-perpetuating board of regents. The first chancellor was Joseph Bartlett Burleigh. After his death in 1849 he was succeeded by J. N. McJilton (1805–1875), an Episcopal clergyman who was active in Baltimore City Public Schools on the Board of School Commissioners. By 1852 the institution had seven professors. The university, located on East Lexington Street between North Calvert and North (later Guilford Avenue) Streets, ran into legal troubles beginning in 1856 and closed in 1859. There is an engraving/sketch of the block showing the buildings in the collections of the former Peale Museum, later the Baltimore City Life Museums which merged into the collections of the Maryland Historical Society in 1997.

https://msa.maryland.gov/msa/stagser/s1259/121/6050/images/i000815.pdf
