= Freestyle skiing at the 2025 Winter World University Games =

Alpine skiing competition

Freestyle skiing at the Torino 2025 FISU World University Games
- Freestyle skiing pictogram
- Venue: Snowpark Melezet Sellette & Campo Smith 1
- Dates: 14–22 January 2025

Freestyle skiing at the 2025 Winter World University Games was held at Snowpark Melezet Sellette & Campo Smith 1 from 14 to 22 January 2025.

== Men's events ==
| Event | Gold | | Silver | | Bronze | |
|---|---|---|---|---|---|---|
| Ski cross | Erik Wahlberg; Sweden | | Sora Sasaoka; Japan | | Yamato Asakawa; Japan | |
| Dual moguls | Shima Kawaoka; Japan | | Anton Bondarev; Kazakhstan | | Jackson Crockett; United States | |
| Moguls | Akseli Ahvenainen; Finland | 81.68 | Shugo Kanno; Japan | 78.17 | Quinn Dawson; Canada | 77.35 |
| Slopestyle | Hugo Picquet; France | 92.25 | Stefan Sorokin; Estonia | 84.75 | Klemen Vidmar; Slovenia | 81.25 |
| Big air | Klemen Vidmar; Slovenia | 88.75 | Oleh Boiko; Ukraine | 86.00 | Marek Krčál; Czech Republic | 84.00 |

== Women's events ==
| Event | Gold | | Silver | | Bronze | |
|---|---|---|---|---|---|---|
| Ski cross | Nathalie Bernard; Italy | | Isabel Hofherr; Austria | | Sage Stefani; Canada | |
| Dual moguls | Anastassiya Gorodko; Kazakhstan | | Ayaulym Amrenova; Kazakhstan | | Marin Ito; Japan | |
| Moguls | Anastassiya Gorodko; Kazakhstan | 79.79 | Haruka Nakao; Japan | 76.29 | Hanna Weese; Germany | 75.04 |
| Slopestyle | Victoire Tillier; France | 84.75 | Lara Shaw; Great Britain | 82.75 | Amélie Cancel; France | 81.50 |
| Big air | Victoire Tillier; France | 91.00 | Mariia Aniichyn; Ukraine | 89.25 | Amélie Cancel; France | 84.75 |

== Medal table ==
* Host nation (Italy)

| Rank | Nation | Gold | Silver | Bronze | Total |
|---|---|---|---|---|---|
| 1 | France | 3 | 0 | 2 | 5 |
| 2 | Kazakhstan | 2 | 2 | 0 | 4 |
| 3 | Japan | 1 | 3 | 2 | 6 |
| 4 | Slovenia | 1 | 0 | 1 | 2 |
| 5 | Finland | 1 | 0 | 0 | 1 |
| 5 | Italy* | 1 | 0 | 0 | 1 |
| 5 | Sweden | 1 | 0 | 0 | 1 |
| 8 | Ukraine | 0 | 2 | 0 | 2 |
| 9 | Austria | 0 | 1 | 0 | 1 |
| 9 | Estonia | 0 | 1 | 0 | 1 |
| 9 | Great Britain | 0 | 1 | 0 | 1 |
| 12 | Canada | 0 | 0 | 2 | 2 |
| 13 | Czech Republic | 0 | 0 | 1 | 1 |
| 13 | Germany | 0 | 0 | 1 | 1 |
| 13 | United States | 0 | 0 | 1 | 1 |
| Totals (15 entries) | | 10 | 10 | 10 | 30 |

== Participating nations ==
- Australia (3)
- Austria (1)
- Belgium (1)
- Canada (12)
- Czech Republic (6)
- Estonia (2)
- Finland (4)
- France (9)
- Georgia (2)
- Germany (7)
- Great Britain (6)
- Italy (3) (Hosts)
- Japan (10)
- Kazakhstan (6)
- Lithuania (1)
- Poland (1)
- Slovakia (3)
- Slovenia (1)
- South Korea (2)
- Sweden (4)
- Ukraine (4)
- United States (19)
