= Alpine skiing at the 2025 Winter World University Games =

Alpine skiing competition

Alpine skiing at the Torino 2025 FISU World University Games
- Alpine skiing pictogram
- Venue: Melezet, Bardonecchia
- Dates: 14–22 January 2025
- Competitors: 259 from 46 nations

Alpine skiing and Para-alpine skiing at the 2025 Winter World University Games was held at Melezet, Bardonecchia from 14 to 22 January 2025.

== Alpine skiing ==
=== Men's events ===
Event	Gold		Silver		Bronze	
Super-G	Ander Mintegui; Spain	57.55	Emil Nyberg; Sweden	57.69	Jonas Skabar; France	57.93
Combined	Loïc Chable; Switzerland	1:39.42	Jonas Skabar; France	1:40.05	Tomás Barata; Spain	1:40.10
Giant slalom	Aleix Aubert; Spain	2:02.72	Loïc Chable; Switzerland	2:03.93	Nick Spörri; Switzerland	2:03.96
Slalom	Takayuki Koyama; Japan	1:20.32	Stefano Pizzato; Italy	1:20.43	Paul Silvestre; France	1:20.58

=== Women's events ===
Event	Gold		Silver		Bronze	
Super-G	Louison Accambray; France	1:00.88	Sophie Nyberg; Sweden	1:00.94	Emy Charbonnier; France	1:01.15
Combined	Emy Charbonnier; France	1:51.21	Sophie Nyberg; Sweden	1:51.81	Louison Accambray; France	1:51.99
Giant slalom	Sue Piller; Switzerland	2:06.58	Delphine Darbellay; Switzerland	2:07.18	Margherita Cecere; Italy	2:07.61
Slalom	Sue Piller; Switzerland	1:19.14	Amélie Klopfenstein; Switzerland	1:19.28	Margherita Cecere; Italy	1:19.29

=== Team event ===
Event	Gold	Silver	Bronze
Mixed team parallel	Sweden; Regina Falk; Emil Nyberg; Stella Rodling Swanberg; Axel Lindqvist	Switzerland; Sue Piller; Gino Stucki; Mathilde Phillips; Löic Chable	France; Louison Accambray; Paul Silvestre; Marjolaine Ollier; Jonas Skabar

== Para-alpine skiing ==
=== Men's events ===
Event	Class	Gold		Silver		Bronze	
Super-G	visually impaired	Michał Gołaś; Guide: Kacper Walas; Poland	1:10.55	Alexander Rauen; Guide: Jeremias Wilke; Germany	1:15.34	Only two competitors	
Super-G	sitting	Nicolás Bisquertt; Chile	1:09.54	Jernej Slivnik; Slovenia	1:15.01	Leon Gensert; Germany	1:23.71
Super-G	standing	Oscar Burnham; France	1:02.27	Arthur Bauchet; France	1:02.43	Jules Segers; France	1:05.03
Giant slalom	visually impaired	Michał Gołaś; Guide: Kacper Walas; Poland	2:13.63	Alexander Rauen; Guide: Jeremias Wilke; Germany	2:23.62	Only two competitors	
Giant slalom	sitting	Jernej Slivnik; Slovenia	2:24.01	Nicolás Bisquertt; Chile	2:24.12	Leon Gensert; Germany	2:31.58
Giant slalom	standing	Arthur Bauchet; France	2:02.78	Jules Segers; France	2:09.61	Oscar Burnham; France	2:10.96

=== Women's events ===
Event	Class	Gold		Silver		Bronze	
Super-G	visually impaired	Martina Vozza; Italy; Guide: Ylenia Sabidussi	1:11.83	Only one competitor			
Super-G	sitting	Audrey Pascual; Spain	1:15.87	Only one competitor			
Super-G	standing	Aurélie Richard; France	1:10.67	María Martín-Granizo; Spain	1:19.38	Only two competitors	
Giant slalom	visually impaired	Martina Vozza; Guide: Ylenia Sabidussi; Italy	2:21.36	Luisa Grube; Guide: Jordi Maurer; Germany	2:58.40	Karla Kordić; Guide: Andrea Jezidžić; Croatia	4:00.83
Giant slalom	sitting	Nette Kiviranta; Finland	2:26.85	Audrey Pascual; Spain	2:31.89	Only two competitors	
Giant slalom	standing	Aurélie Richard; France	2:23.84	María Martín-Granizo; Spain	2:40.78	Laura Streng; Austria	3:05.19

== Medal table ==
* Host nation (Italy)

Rank	Nation	Gold	Silver	Bronze	Total
1	France	6	3	7	16
2	Switzerland	3	4	1	8
3	Spain	3	3	1	7
4	Italy*	2	1	2	5
5	Poland	2	0	0	2
6	Sweden	1	3	0	4
7	Chile	1	1	0	2
7	Slovenia	1	1	0	2
9	Finland	1	0	0	1
9	Japan	1	0	0	1
11	Germany	0	3	2	5
12	Austria	0	0	1	1
12	Croatia	0	0	1	1
Totals (13 entries)		21	19	15	55

== Participating nations ==
=== Alpine skiing ===
- Argentina (1)
- Armenia (2)
- Australia (2)
- Austria (11)
- Belgium (7)
- Brazil (3)
- Bulgaria (3)
- Canada (10)
- Chile (3)
- China (8)
- Chinese Taipei (1)
- Croatia (1)
- Czech Republic (9)
- Estonia (1)
- France (11)
- Georgia (2)
- Germany (9)
- Great Britain (4)
- Hong Kong (2)
- Hungary (6)
- Ireland (3)
- Italy (21) (Hosts)
- Japan (6)
- Kazakhstan (2)
- Kosovo (2)
- Latvia (1)
- Lebanon (6)
- Liechtenstein (4)
- Luxembourg (2)
- Mongolia (3)
- Netherlands (4)
- New Zealand (5)
- Poland (6)
- Portugal (2)
- Romania (1)
- Singapore (1)
- Slovakia (4)
- Slovenia (7)
- South Korea (8)
- Spain (8)
- Sweden (15)
- Switzerland (17)
- Turkey (8)
- Ukraine (3)
- United States (5)
