= Bulgaria at the 2025 Winter World University Games =

- IOC code: BUL
- NOC: Association For University Sport Academic

in Turin, Italy 13 January 2025 – 23 January 2025
- Competitors: 9 (6 men and 3 women) in 4 sports
- Medals Ranked 22nd: Gold 1 Silver 0 Bronze 2 Total 3

Winter Universiade appearances
- 1960; 1962; 1964; 1966; 1968; 1972; 1978; 1981; 1983; 1985; 1987; 1989; 1991; 1993; 1995; 1997; 1999; 2001; 2003; 2005; 2007; 2009; 2011; 2013; 2015; 2017; 2019; 2023; 2025

Bulgaria competed at the 2025 Winter World University Games in Turin, Italy, from 13 to 23 January 2025.

== Medalists ==
Bulgaria finished on the twenty-second place in the medal table with three medals.

Medal	Name	Sport	Event	Date
Gold	Tervel Zamfirov	Snowboarding	Men's parallel giant slalom	21 January
Bronze	Mario Matikanov	Cross-country skiing	Men's 10km individual free	15 January
Bronze	Alexander Krashniak	Snowboarding	Men's parallel slalom	22 January

== Competitors ==
At the 2025 Winter World University Games was participated 9 athletes.

Sport	Men	Women	Total
Alpine skiing	2	1	3
Cross-country skiing	2	1	3
Ski orienteering	0	1	1
Snowboarding	2	0	2
Total	6	3	9
