= Ambis University =

Czech private university in Prague

- Ambis Univerzita
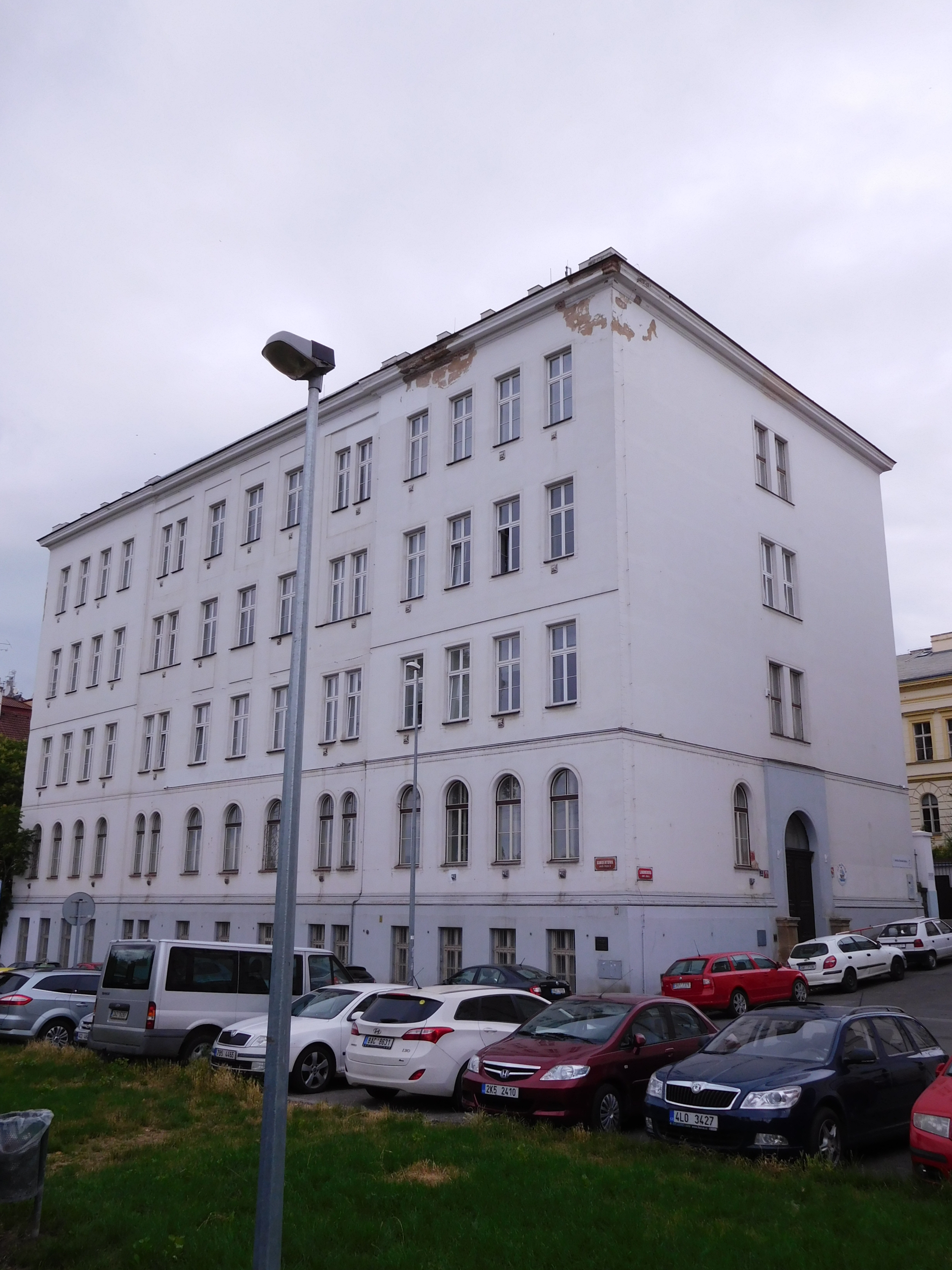
- Type: Private
- Established: 1994; 32 years ago
- Rector: Dr. rer. nat. Martina Mannová
- Students: 7,339 (2025)
- Location: Prague, Czech Republic; 50°3′10.77″N 14°19′58.71″E
- Campus: Prague-Libeň
- Website: www.ambisuniversity.com
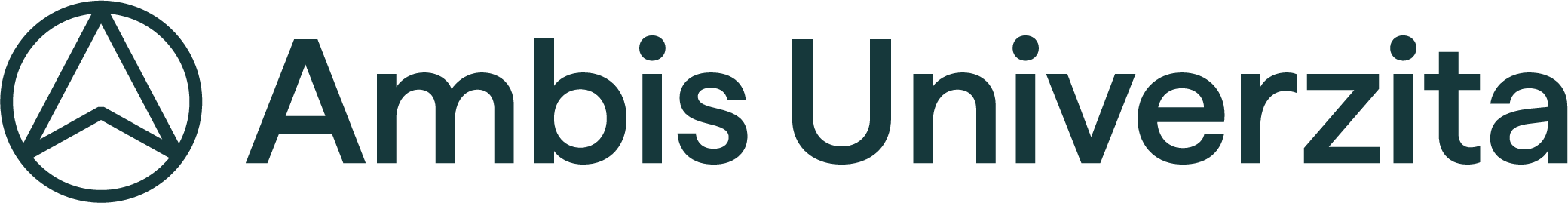

The Ambis University (Ambis; Czech: Ambis Univerzita) is a private university in Prague, Czech Republic.

== History ==
The Ambis University, formerly known as the Banking Institute University, was authorized by Ministry of Education, Youth and Sports of the Czech Republic in 1999 as the first private higher education institution in the Czech Republic. It began its operation as a university in 2000. In 2001, a German training company-holding company COGNOS AG, partnered with the university and it became the first private Czech university with a strategic foreign partner. Within the framework of its external development it has established new regional consulting centers both in Czechia and Slovakia.

== Programs of study ==
The study system includes three programs:

- Bachelor study program, available in daily and combined studies
- Master study program, with two branches available in the forms of daily and combined studies
- Doctoral study program with one field of study, available in combined studies
- Lifelong learning qualification and re-qualification programs focused on the study of banking, information technologies, property valuation and languages
