= Chile at the 2025 Winter World University Games =

- IOC code: CHI
- NOC: Federación Nacional Universitaria de Deportes de Chile

in Turin, Italy 13 January 2025 – 23 January 2025
- Competitors: 6 (5 men and 1 woman) in 3 sports
- Medals Ranked 21st: Gold 1 Silver 1 Bronze 0 Total 2

Winter Universiade appearances
- 1960; 1962; 1964; 1966; 1968; 1972; 1978; 1981; 1983; 1985; 1987; 1989; 1991; 1993; 1995; 1997; 1999; 2001; 2003; 2005; 2007; 2009; 2011; 2013; 2015; 2017; 2019; 2023; 2025

Chile competed at the 2025 Winter World University Games in Turin, Italy, from 13 to 23 January 2025.

== Medalists ==
Chile finished on the twenty-first place in the medal table with two medals.

Medal	Name	Sport	Event	Date
Gold	Nicolás Bisquertt	Para-alpine skiing	Men's super-g sitting	16 January
Silver	Nicolás Bisquertt	Para-alpine skiing	Men's giant slalom sitting	18 January

== Competitors ==
At the 2025 Winter World University Games was participated 6 athletes.

Sport	Men	Women	Total
Alpine skiing	2	1	3
Cross-country skiing	2	0	2
Para-alpine skiing	1	0	1
Total	5	1	6
