= Daryna Chalyk =

Ukrainian biathlete (born 2001)

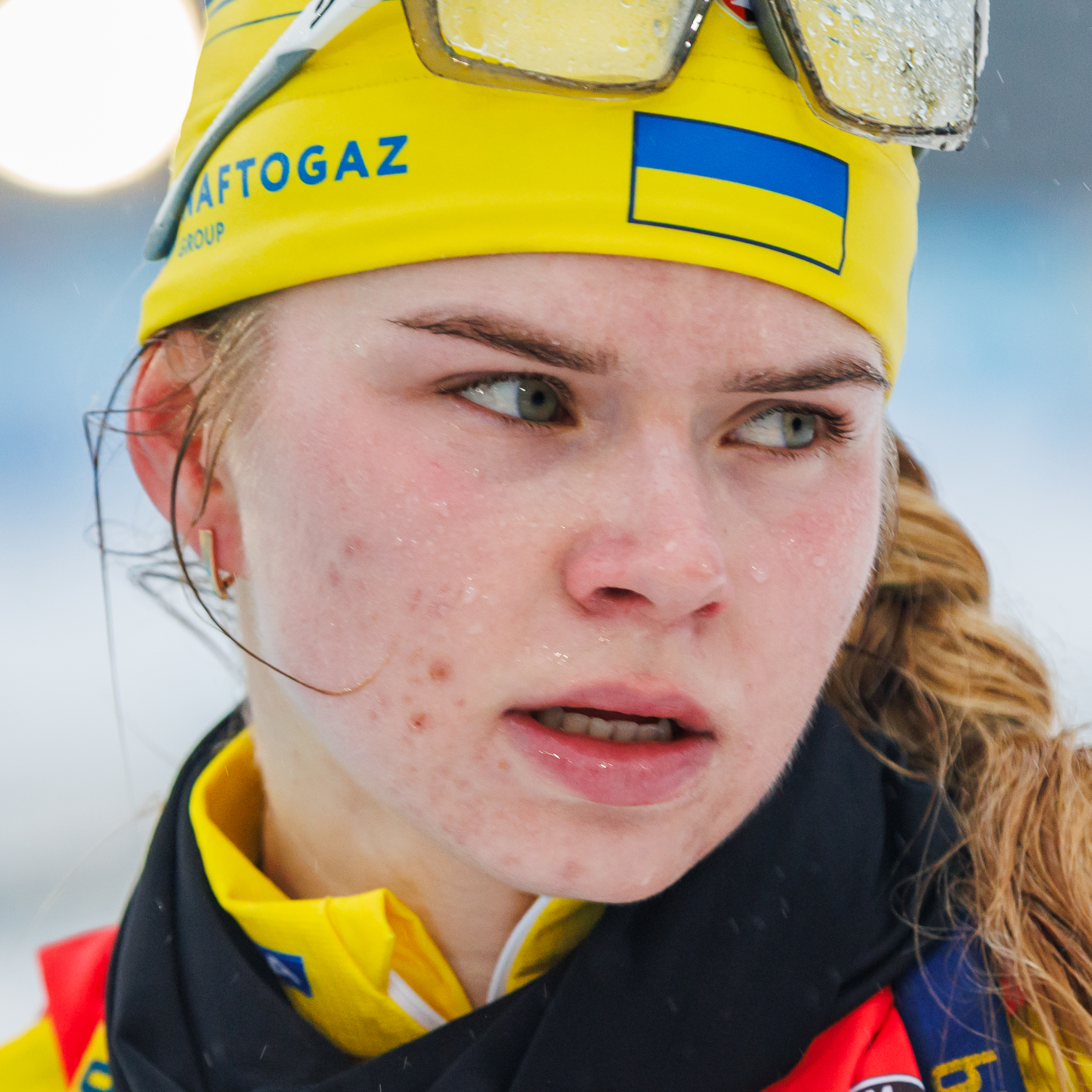
- Chalyk in 2025

Personal information
- Nationality: Ukrainian
- Born: 19 August 2001 (age 24) Naumivka, Koriukivka Raion, Chernihiv Oblast, Ukraine
- Education: T.H. Shevchenko National University "Chernihiv Colehium"
- Years active: 2020-present

Sport
- Country: Ukraine
- Sport: Biathlon
Medal record
Women's biathlon
Representing Ukraine
Winter Universiade
Gold medal – first place	2025 Torino	Mass start
Bronze medal – third place	2025 Torino	Individual
Bronze medal – third place	2025 Torino	Pursuit
Junior European Championships
Bronze medal – third place	2023 Madona	Mixed relay

Daryna Viktorivna Chalyk (Ukrainian: Дарина Вікторівна Чалик; born 19 August 2001) is a Ukrainian World Cup biathlete. She represented Ukraine at the 2026 Winter Olympics.

== Early life ==
Daryna Chalyk was born on August 19, 2001 in Naumivka village in Chernihiv Oblast. She is a graduate of the Chernihiv Regional School of Higher Sportsmanship, and is coached by Zhanna and Mykola Zots. She is currently studying at T.H. Shevchenko National University "Chernihiv Colehium".

== Career ==
In December 2020, at the age of 19, she won the Ukrainian Senior Biathlon Championship, held in Bukovel, in women's team relay event. In February 2021, she competed at the Junior World Championships, finishing 66th in 12.5 km individual.

In December 2022, at the 2022/23 biathlon season, Chalyk finished 13th in sprint, 17th in individual and 4th in mixed relay at the IBU Junior World Cup in Obertilliach. In February 2023, at the IBU Junior Cup in Haanja, she took third place in the relay together with Olena Horodna, Oleksandra Merkushyna and Yuliya Horodna. Another podium in the IBU Junior Cup was followed by a bronze medal with Stepan Kinash, Vitalii Mandzyn and Oleksandra Merkushyna at the 2023 European Junior Championships.

In December 2024, she finished 9th in 7.5 km sprint at the IBU Biathlon World Cup stage in Obertilliach. In January 2025, she won a gold and two bronze medals for Ukraine in mass start, individual and pursuit events respectively at the Winter Universiade in Turin.

== Biathlon results ==
All results are sourced from the International Biathlon Union.

=== Olympic Games ===
0 medals

Event	Individual	Sprint	Pursuit	Mass start	Relay	Mixed relay
(Italy) 2026 Milano Cortina	61st	—	—	—	9th	—

=== World Cup ===
Season	Overall			Individual		Sprint		Pursuit		Mass start	
Season	Races	Points	Position	Points	Position	Points	Position	Points	Position	Points	Position
2024–25	4/21	Didn't earn World Cup points									
2025–26	/21										
