= Biathlon at the 2025 Winter World University Games =

Alpine skiing competition

Biathlon at the Torino 2025 FISU World University Games
- Biathlon pictogram
- Venue: Pragelato Rua
- Dates: 14–22 January 2025
- Competitors: 105 from 19 nations

Biathlon at the 2025 Winter World University Games was held at Pragelato Rua from 14 to 22 January 2025.

== Men's events ==
Event	Gold		Silver		Bronze	
15 km short individual	Bohdan Borkovskyi; Ukraine	38:40.9 (0+0+1+2)	Patrik Kuuttinen; Finland	39:06.4 (0+0+0+0)	Petr Hák; Czech Republic	39:10.1 (1+1+0+0)
10 km sprint	Nikita Akimov; Kazakhstan	23:34.1 (0+0)	Knut Vikström; Sweden	23:36.3 (0+1)	Bohdan Borkovskyi; Ukraine	23:39.7 (0+1)
12.5 km pursuit	Bohdan Borkovskyi; Ukraine	37:48.9 (0+2+1+1)	Serhii Suprun; Ukraine	38:17.8 (0+0+2+2)	Paul Fontaine; France	38:22.2 (0+1+1+2)
15 km mass start	Nathanaël Peaquin; France	42:53.1 (1+0+2+0)	Karl Grönland; Sweden	43:21.2 (1+0+0+0)	Kirill Bauer; Kazakhstan	43:26.9 (1+0+0+3)

== Women's events ==
Event	Gold		Silver		Bronze	
12.5 km short individual	Noémie Remonnay; France	37:37.1 (0+1+1+0)	Amelia Liszka; Poland	38:14.7 (0+0+0+0)	Daryna Chalyk; Ukraine	39:04.2 (1+2+0+1)
7.5 km sprint	Barbara Skrobiszewska; Poland	22:14.4 (1+0)	Amelia Liszka; Poland	23:09.0 (0+1)	Arina Kryukova; Kazakhstan	23:17.6 (0+2)
10 km pursuit	Barbara Skrobiszewska; Poland	37:40.6 (0+0+2+1)	Amelia Liszka; Poland	38:10.6 (2+0+0+0)	Daryna Chalyk; Ukraine	38:38.3 (0+1+3+1)
12.5 km mass start	Daryna Chalyk; Ukraine	41:46.6 (1+1+1+0)	Oleksandra Merkushyna; Ukraine	42:25.5 (1+0+0+1)	Luise Müller; Germany	42:26.0 (0+0+2+0)

== Mixed events ==
Event	Gold		Silver		Bronze	
6 km W + 7.5 km M single relay	Ukraine; Oleksandra Merkushyna; Serhii Suprun	39:52.5 (0+2) (0+2) (0+1) (0+1) (0+0) (0+0) (0+1) (0+1)	Czech Republic; Svatava Mikysková; Petr Hák	40:09.2 (0+0) (0+0) (0+1) (1+3) (0+0) (0+0) (0+0) (0+0)	Poland; Anna Nędza-Kubiniec; Jakub Potoniec	40:15.7 (0+1) (0+0) (0+1) (0+1) (0+2) (1+3) (0+0) (0+1)

== Medal table ==
Rank	Nation	Gold	Silver	Bronze	Total
1	Ukraine	4	2	3	9
2	Poland	2	3	1	6
3	France	2	0	1	3
4	Kazakhstan	1	0	2	3
5	Sweden	0	2	0	2
6	Czech Republic	0	1	1	2
7	Finland	0	1	0	1
8	Germany	0	0	1	1
Totals (8 entries)		9	9	9	27

== Participating nations ==
- Australia (2)
- Canada (12)
- Czech Republic (8)
- Estonia (1)
- Finland (6)
- France (6)
- Germany (3)
- Great Britain (2)
- Italy (3) (Hosts)
- Japan (2)
- Kazakhstan (10)
- Netherlands (2)
- Poland (10)
- Slovakia (3)
- South Korea (8)
- Spain (2)
- Sweden (6)
- Ukraine (9)
- United States (10)
