= Kazakhstan at the 2025 Winter World University Games =

- IOC code: KAZ
- NOC: Student Sports Federation of the Republic of Kazakhstan

in Turin, Italy 13 January 2025 – 23 January 2025
- Competitors: 101 (53 men and 48 women) in 10 sports
- Flag bearers: Ayaulym Amrenova (freestyle skiing); Abylaikhan Suleimenov (ice hockey)
- Medals Ranked 12th: Gold 3 Silver 4 Bronze 7 Total 14

Winter Universiade appearances
- 1960; 1962; 1964; 1966; 1968; 1972; 1978; 1981; 1983; 1985; 1987; 1989; 1991; 1993; 1995; 1997; 1999; 2001; 2003; 2005; 2007; 2009; 2011; 2013; 2015; 2017; 2019; 2023; 2025

Kazakhstan competed at the 2025 Winter World University Games in Turin, Italy, from 13 to 23 January 2025.

== Medalists ==
Kazakhstan finished on the twelfth place in the medal table with fourteen medals.

| Medal | Name | Sport | Event | Date |
|---|---|---|---|---|
| Gold | Anastassiya Gorodko | Freestyle skiing | Women's moguls | 14 January |
| Gold | Anastassiya Gorodko | Freestyle skiing | Women's dual moguls | 15 January |
| Gold | Nikita Akimov | Biathlon | Men's 10km sprint | 18 January |
| Silver | Ayaulym Amrenova | Freestyle skiing | Women's dual moguls | 15 January |
| Silver | Anton Bondarev | Freestyle skiing | Men's dual moguls | 15 January |
| Silver | Denis Zinov | Para-cross-country skiing | Men's 10 km free technique standing | 15 January |
| Silver | Denis Zinov | Para-cross-country skiing | Men's sprint classic technique standing | 17 January |
| Bronze | Roman Kurbanov | Para-cross-country skiing | Men's 10 km free technique vision impaired | 15 January |
| Bronze | Roman Kurbanov | Para-cross-country skiing | Men's sprint classic technique vision impaired | 17 January |
| Bronze | Arina Kryukova | Biathlon | Women's 7.5km sprint | 18 January |
| Bronze | Sofia Samodelkina | Figure skating | Women single skating | 18 January |
| Bronze | Kirill Bauer | Biathlon | Men's 15km mass start | 22 January |
| Bronze | Malika Yermek; Alina Azhgaliyeva; Valeriy Klimenko; Dinmukhamedaldiyar Tazhibay; Yana Khan; Aibek Temirkhan | Short track speed skating | Mixed team relay | 22 January |
| Bronze | Sanzhar Zhanissov; Valeriy Klimenko; Aibek Temirkhan; Dinmukhamedaldiyar Tazhibay; Alisher Abulkatimov | Short track speed skating | Men's 5000m relay | 23 January |

== Competitors ==
At the 2025 Winter World University Games was participated 101 athletes. Ayaulym Amrenova (freestyle skiing) and Abylaikhan Suleimenov (ice hockey) were a flag bearers at the opening ceremony.

| Sport | Men | Women | Total |
|---|---|---|---|
| Alpine skiing | 0 | 2 | 2 |
| Biathlon | 5 | 5 | 10 |
| Cross-country skiing | 6 | 6 | 12 |
| Figure skating | 3 | 1 | 4 |
| Freestyle skiing | 4 | 2 | 6 |
| Ice hockey | 23 | 22 | 45 |
| Para-cross-country skiing | 2 | 0 | 2 |
| Short track speed skating | 5 | 5 | 10 |
| Ski orienteering | 5 | 5 | 10 |
| Total | 53 | 48 | 101 |
