= Australia at the 2025 Winter World University Games =

- IOC code: AUS
- NOC: UniSport Australia

in Turin, Italy 13 January 2025 – 23 January 2025
- Competitors: 19 (13 men and 6 women) in 6 sports
- Flag bearers: Bentley Walker-Broose (snowboarding); Isabella Moon (biathlon and cross-country skiing)
- Medals: Gold 0 Silver 0 Bronze 0 Total 0

Winter Universiade appearances (overview)
- 1960; 1962; 1964; 1966; 1968; 1972; 1978; 1981; 1983; 1985; 1987; 1989; 1991; 1993; 1995; 1997; 1999; 2001; 2003; 2005; 2007; 2009; 2011; 2013; 2015; 2017; 2019; 2023; 2025

Australia competed at the 2025 Winter World University Games in Turin, Italy, from 13 to 23 January 2025.

== Competitors ==
At the 2025 Winter World University Games was participated 19 athletes. Bentley Walker-Broose (snowboarding) and Isabella Moon (biathlon and cross-country skiing) were a flag bearers at the opening ceremony.

Sport	Men	Women	Total
Alpine skiing	1	0	1
Biathlon	1	1	2
Cross-country skiing	5	2	1
Freestyle skiing	2	1	3
Short track speed skating	1	0	1
Snowboarding	4	3	7
Total	14	7	21
