= United States at the 2025 Winter World University Games =

- IOC code: USA
- NOC: United States International University Sports Federation

in Turin, Italy 13 January 2025 – 23 January 2025
- Competitors: 123 (65 men and 58 women)
- Medals Ranked 23rd: Gold 0 Silver 1 Bronze 1 Total 2

Winter Universiade appearances (overview)
- 1966; 1968; 1972; 1978; 1981; 1983; 1985; 1987; 1989; 1991; 1993; 1995; 1997; 1999; 2001; 2003; 2005; 2007; 2009; 2011; 2013; 2015; 2017; 2019; 2023; 2025

United States competed at the 2025 Winter World University Games in Turin, Italy, from 13 to 23 January 2025.

== Medalists ==
United States finished on the twenty-third place in the medal table with two medals.

Medal	Name	Sport	Event	Date
Silver	Caden Hebert; Jackson Bestland; Jackson Armstrong; Jack Wendland; Connor Kauffman	Curling	Men	23 January
Bronze	Jackson Crockett	Freestyle skiing	Men's dual moguls	15 January

== Competitors ==
At the 2025 Winter World University Games participated 123 athletes.

Sport	Men	Women	Total
Alpine skiing	3	2	5
Biathlon	4	6	10
Cross-country skiing	6	6	12
Curling	6	6	12
Freestyle skiing	8	7	15
Ice hockey	23	23	46
Short track speed skating	6	2	8
Ski mountaineering	5	2	7
Snowboarding	4	4	8
Total	65	58	123
