= Slovakia at the 2025 Winter World University Games =

- IOC code: SVK
- NOC: Slovenská asociácia univerzitného športu
- Website: www.saus.sk

in Turin, Italy 13 January 2025 – 23 January 2025
- Competitors: 64 in 9 sports
- Medals Ranked 24th: Gold 0 Silver 1 Bronze 0 Total 1

Winter Universiade appearances (overview)
- 1993; 1995; 1997; 1999; 2001; 2003; 2005; 2007; 2009; 2011; 2013; 2015; 2017; 2019; 2023; 2025

Slovakia competed at the 2025 Winter World University Games in Turin, Italy, from 13 to 23 January 2025.

== Medalists ==
The men's ice hockey team won the silver medal after losing to Canada in the final.

Medal	Name	Sport	Event	Date
Silver	Patrik Andrisík; Denis Bakala; Simon Bečár; Tomáš Boľo; Jakub Gaťár; Šimon Groch; Jozef Haščák; Matej Jacko; Matej Komloš; Ján Marcinko; Samuel Nagy; Miroslav Novota; Richard Petráš; Marek Putala; Jakub Ragan; Michal Stanček; Timotej Tomala; Jakub Uram; Lukáš Urbánek; Matúš Zemko; Adam Zlocha	Ice hockey	Men	22 January

== Competitors ==
At the 2025 Winter World University Games was participated 64 athletes.

Sport	Men	Women	Total
Alpine skiing	3	1	4
Biathlon	1	2	3
Cross-country skiing	2	1	3
Freestyle skiing	1	1	2
Ice hockey	22	22	44
Ski orienteering	1	1	2
Ski mountaineering	1	1	2
Short track speed skating	1	1	2
Snowboarding	0	2	2
Total	32	32	64

Athlete	Date of birth	Sport	University	Sex
Patrik Andrisík	19 February 2003	Ice hockey	Alexander Dubček University of Trenčín	M
Denis Bakala	10 October 2002	Ice hockey	Matej Bel University	M
Simon Bečár	16 April 2003	Ice hockey	University of Žilina	M
Tomáš Boľo	3 July 2002	Ice hockey	Matej Bel University	M
Júlia Čillíková	26 October 2004	Ice hockey	Comenius University	F
Mária Danielová	21 August 2001	Cross-country skiing	University of Prešov	F
Hana Fančovičová	2 May 2004	Ice hockey	Comenius University	F
Nicolas Ferenyi	4 October 2000	Ice hockey	Alexander Dubček University of Trenčín	M
Martin Ferjanček	17 February 2005	Alpine skiing	Matej Bel University	M
Diana Fortunová	5 December 2000	Ice hockey	University of Prešov	F
Nikola Fričová	1 January 2001	Freestyle skiing	Comenius University	F
Jakub Gaťár	24 December 2001	Ice hockey	Danubius University	M
Lea Giertlová	27 May 2005	Ice hockey	Matej Bel University	F
Lea Glosíková	25 July 2005	Ice hockey	Bratislava University of Economics and Management	F
Šimon Groch	10 March 2003	Ice hockey	Bratislava University of Economics and Management	M
Lucia Halušková	18 December 2000	Ice hockey	Alexander Dubček University of Trenčín	F
Romana Halušková	12 May 2003	Ice hockey	University of Žilina	F
Jozef Haščák	7 August 2001	Ice hockey	Alexander Dubček University of Trenčín	M
Matej Horniak	22 May 2003	Cross-country skiing	Brno University of Technology	M
Nina Hudáková	8 April 2004	Ice hockey	Wilkes University	F
Emma Hympanová	8 December 2003	Short track speed skating	University of Prešov	F
Matej Jacko	8 August 2002	Ice hockey	Technical University of Košice	M
Nikola Janeková	22 November 2004	Ice hockey	Alexander Dubček University of Trenčín	F
Ema Jašková	18 November 2002	Ice hockey	Nichols College	F
Jakub Karabin	19 October 2004	Short track speed skating	University of Prešov	M
Matej Komloš	23 April 2000	Ice hockey	University of Prešov	M
Jakub Kováčik	16 April 2002	Biathlon	Matej Bel University	M
Lívia Kúbeková	27 August 2001	Ice hockey	Comenius University	F
Emília Leskovjanska	7 September 2003	Ice hockey	Comenius University	F
Annamaria Lodňanová	3 September 2000	Ice hockey	Jönköping University	F
Samuel Machaj	17 March 2003	Ski mountaineering	Matej Bel University	M
Sára Machajová	4 August 2000	Ski mountaineering	Matej Bel University	F
Simona Macková	7 December 2004	Ice hockey	Slovak University of Technology in Bratislava	F
Ján Marcinko	8 November 2002	Ice hockey	Technical University of Košice	M
Sylvia Maťašová	20 July 2000	Ice hockey	Technical University of Košice	F
Lea Meszárošová	7 August 2003	Biathlon	Matej Bel University	F
Tamara Miklušová	2 August 2002	Ski orienteering	Masaryk University	F
Samuel Nagy	24 April 2001	Ice hockey	University of Prešov	M
Nikola Nemčeková	4 July 2002	Ice hockey	Comenius University	F
Miroslav Novota	8 October 2001	Ice hockey	Technical University of Košice	M
Richard Petráš	20 June 2002	Ice hockey	University of Economics in Bratislava	M
Katarína Pitoňáková	19 November 2003	Snowboarding	Matej Bel University	F
Sára Pitoňáková	3 February 2005	Snowboarding	Matej Bel University	F
Emma Plankenauerová	23 December 2003	Ice hockey	University of Economics in Bratislava	F
Marek Putala	4 December 2002	Ice hockey	Alexander Dubček University of Trenčín	M
Jakub Ragan	28 January 2002	Ice hockey		M
Andrea Rišianová	20 January 2000	Ice hockey	St. Elizabeth University of Health and Social Work in Bratislava	F
Martin Roháč	19 May 2003	Ski orienteering	Brno University of Technology	M
Ján Sanitrár	15 January 2005	Alpine skiing, Freestyle skiing	Technical University in Zvolen	M
Kristína Šimnová	15 May 2001	Ice hockey	Comenius University	F
Katarína Šrobová	5 January 2005	Alpine skiing	Comenius University	F
Michal Stanček	20 December 2002	Ice hockey	University of Prešov	M
Alžbeta Šulíková	7 April 2001	Ice hockey	Comenius University	F
Laura Šulíková	29 October 2001	Ice hockey	Comenius University	F
Denis Tilesch	9 April 2002	Cross-country skiing	Matej Bel University	M
Timotej Tomala	6 October 2003	Ice hockey	University of Economics in Bratislava	M
Jakub Uram	2 July 2000	Ice hockey	Bratislava University of Economics and Management	M
Lukáš Urbánek	20 December 2001	Ice hockey	Alexander Dubček University of Trenčín	M
Jakub Válek	27 November 2002	Freestyle skiing	Matej Bel University	M
Sofia Vysokajová	5 August 2002	Ice hockey	Comenius University	F
Teo Žampa	12 October 2002	Alpine skiing	City University of Seattle	M
Matúš Zemko	18 September 2002	Ice hockey		M
Adam Zlocha	18 August 2001	Ice hockey	Alexander Dubček University of Trenčín	M
Ema Zvarová	2 July 2005	Biathlon	Slovak Medical University	F
