= South Korea at the 2025 Winter World University Games =

- IOC code: KOR
- NOC: Korean University Sports Board

in Turin, Italy 13 January 2025 – 23 January 2025
- Competitors: 79 in 10 sports
- Medals Ranked 2nd: Gold 8 Silver 6 Bronze 6 Total 20

Winter Universiade appearances (overview)
- 1960; 1962; 1964; 1966; 1968; 1972; 1978; 1981; 1983; 1985; 1987; 1989; 1991; 1993; 1995; 1997; 1999; 2001; 2003; 2005; 2007; 2009; 2011; 2013; 2015; 2017; 2019; 2023; 2025

South Korea competed at the 2025 Winter World University Games in Turin, Italy, from 13 to 23 January 2025.

== Medalists ==
South Korea finished on the second place in the medal table with 20 medals. Kim Gil-li won 5 gold medals in all five events.

Medal	Name	Sport	Event	Date
Gold	Kim Tae-sung	Short track speed skating	Men's 1500m	21 January
Gold	Kim Gil-li	Short track speed skating	Women's 1500m	21 January
Gold	Kim Tae-sung	Short track speed skating	Men's 500m	22 January
Gold	Kim Gil-li	Short track speed skating	Women's 500m	22 January
Gold	Kim Geon-hee; Kim Gil-li; Kim Tae-sung; Lee Dong-hyun; Bae Seo-chan; Seo Whi-min	Short track speed skating	Mixed team relay	22 January
Gold	Kim Tae-sung	Short track speed skating	Men's 1000m	23 January
Gold	Kim Gil-li	Short track speed skating	Women's 1000m	23 January
Gold	Kim Geon-hee; Kim Gil-li; Lee Ji-a; Seo Whi-min; Kim Eun-seo	Short track speed skating	Women's 3000m relay	23 January
Silver	Lee Dong-hyun	Short track speed skating	Men's 1500m	21 January
Silver	Seo Whi-min	Short track speed skating	Women's 1500m	21 January
Silver	Ma Jun-ho	Snowboarding	Men's parallel giant slalom	21 January
Silver	Kang Bo-bae; Kim Ji-soo; Shim Yu-jeong; Kim Min-seo; Jeong Jae-hee	Curling	Women	23 January
Silver	Bae Seo-chan	Short track speed skating	Men's 1000m	23 January
Silver	Seo Whi-min	Short track speed skating	Women's 1000m	23 January
Bronze	Cha Jun-hwan	Figure skating	Men single skating	18 January
Bronze	Bae Seo-chan	Short track speed skating	Men's 1500m	21 January
Bronze	Kim Geon-hee	Short track speed skating	Women's 1500m	21 January
Bronze	Lee Dong-hyun	Short track speed skating	Men's 500m	22 January
Bronze	Seo Whi-min	Short track speed skating	Women's 500m	22 January
Bronze	Lee Dong-hyun	Short track speed skating	Men's 1000m	23 January

== Competitors ==
At the 2025 Winter World University Games was participated 79 athletes.

Sport	Men	Women	Total
Alpine skiing	4	4	8
Biathlon	4	4	8
Cross-country skiing	5	2	7
Curling	5	5	10
Figure skating	3	2	5
Freestyle skiing	2	0	2
Ice hockey	23	0	23
Short track speed skating	5	5	10
Ski mountaineering	1	0	1
Snowboarding	4	1	5
Total	56	23	79
