= Germany at the 2025 Winter World University Games =

- IOC code: GER
- NOC: German University Sports Federation

in Turin, Italy 13 January 2025 – 23 January 2025
- Competitors: 53 in 10 sports
- Flag bearers: Hanna Weese, Leon Gensert
- Medals Ranked 5th: Gold 6 Silver 9 Bronze 8 Total 23

Winter Universiade appearances
- 1960; 1962; 1964; 1966; 1968; 1972; 1978; 1981; 1983; 1985; 1987; 1989; 1991; 1993; 1995; 1997; 1999; 2001; 2003; 2005; 2007; 2009; 2011; 2013; 2015; 2017; 2019; 2023; 2025

Germany competed at the 2025 Winter World University Games in Turin, Italy, from 13 to 23 January 2025.

== Medalists ==
Germany finished on the fifth place in the medal table with 23 medals.

Medal	Name	Sport	Event	Date
Gold	Marco Maier	Para-cross-country skiing	Men's 10 km free technique standing	15 January
Gold	Leonie Walter	Para-cross-country skiing	Women's 10 km free technique	15 January
Gold	Finn Hösch	Ski mountaineering	Men's sprint	16 January
Gold	Marco Maier	Para-cross-country skiing	Men's sprint classic technique standing	17 January
Gold	Leonie Walter	Para-cross-country skiing	Women's sprint classic technique	17 January
Gold	Marius Bauer; Miriam Reisnecker	Cross-country skiing	Mixed sprint team	19 January
Silver	Kim Sutor; Klaudius Harsch	Curling	Mixed doubles	14 January
Silver	Lennart Volkert	Para-cross-country skiing	Men's 10 km free technique vision impaired	15 January
Silver	Johanna Recktenwald	Para-cross-country skiing	Women's 10 km free technique	15 January
Silver	Alexander Rauen	Para-alpine skiing	Men's super-g vision impaired	16 January
Silver	Lennart Volkert	Para-cross-country skiing	Men's sprint classic technique vision impaired	17 January
Silver	Johanna Recktenwald	Para-cross-country skiing	Women's sprint classic technique	17 January
Silver	Alexander Rauen	Para-alpine skiing	Men's giant slalom vision impaired	18 January
Silver	Luisa Grube	Para-alpine skiing	Women's giant slalom vision impaired	18 January
Silver	Felix Gramelsberger	Ski mountaineering	Men's vertical race	19 January
Bronze	Hanna Weese	Freestyle skiing	Women's moguls	14 January
Bronze	Umito Kirchwehm	Snowboarding	Men's snowboard cross	14 January
Bronze	Leon Gensert	Para-alpine skiing	Men's super-g sitting	16 January
Bronze	Felix Gramelsberger	Ski mountaineering	Men's sprint	16 January
Bronze	Sophia Weßling; Finn Hösch	Ski mountaineering	Mixed relay	17 January
Bronze	Leon Gensert	Para-alpine skiing	Men's giant slalom sitting	18 January
Bronze	Moritz Breu	Snowboarding	Men's snowboard big air	19 January
Bronze	Luise Müller	Biathlon	Women's 12.5km mass start	22 January

== Competitors ==
At the 2025 Winter World University Games was participated 53 athletes. Hanna Weese and Leon Gensert was a flag bearers.

Sport	Men	Women	Total
Alpine skiing	4	5	9
Biathlon	2	1	3
Cross-country skiing	7	2	9
Curling	1	1	2
Freestyle skiing	4	3	7
Para-alpine skiing	4	1	5
Para-cross-country skiing	2	2	4
Ski mountaineering	3	1	4
Ski orienteering	1	2	3
Snowboarding	7	0	7
Total	35	18	53
