= France at the 2025 Winter World University Games =

- IOC code: FRA
- NOC: Fédération française du sport universitaire

in Turin, Italy 13 January 2025 – 23 January 2025
- Competitors: 72 in 9 sports
- Medals Ranked 1st: Gold 18 Silver 8 Bronze 14 Total 40

Winter Universiade appearances
- 1960; 1962; 1964; 1966; 1968; 1972; 1978; 1981; 1983; 1985; 1987; 1989; 1991; 1993; 1995; 1997; 1999; 2001; 2003; 2005; 2007; 2009; 2011; 2013; 2015; 2017; 2019; 2023; 2025

France competed at the 2025 Winter World University Games in Turin, Italy, from 13 to 23 January 2025.

== Medalists ==
Medal	Name	Sport	Event	Date
Gold	Noémie Remonnay	Biathlon	Women's 12.5 km short individual	14 January
Gold	Quentin Sodogas	Snowboarding	Men's cross	14 January
Gold	Camille Poulat	Snowboarding	Women's cross	14 January
Gold	Emy Charbonnier	Alpine skiing	Women's alpine combined	15 January
Gold	Oscar Burnham	Para-alpine skiing	Men's super-g standing	16 January
Gold	Aurélie Richard	Para-alpine skiing	Women's super-g standing	16 January
Gold	Margot Ravinel	Ski mountaineering	Women's sprint	16 January
Gold	Louison Accambray	Alpine skiing	Women's super-g	17 January
Gold	Hugo Picouet	Freestyle skiing	Men's freeski slopestyle	17 January
Gold	Victoire Tillier	Freestyle skiing	Women's freeski slopestyle	17 January
Gold	Margot Ravinel; Pablo Giner	Ski mountaineering	Mixed relay	17 January
Gold	Noé Petit	Snowboarding	Men's slopestyle	17 January
Gold	Arthur Bauchet	Para-alpine skiing	Men's giant slalom standing	18 January
Gold	Aurélie Richard	Para-alpine skiing	Women's giant slalom standing	18 January
Gold	Victoire Tillier	Freestyle skiing	Women's freeski big air	19 January
Gold	Rémi Cantan	Ski mountaineering	Men's vertical race	19 January
Gold	Margot Ravinel	Ski mountaineering	Women's vertical race	19 January
Gold	Nathanael Peaquin	Biathlon	Men's 15 km mass start	22 January
Silver	Margaux Herpin	Snowboarding	Women's cross	14 January
Silver	Jonas Skabar	Alpine skiing	Men's alpine combined	16 January
Silver	Arthur Bauchet	Para-alpine skiing	Men's super-g standing	16 January
Silver	Pablo Giner	Ski mountaineering	Men's sprint	16 January
Silver	Lou Terreaux; Noé Perron	Figure skating	Ice dance	17 January
Silver	Jules Segers	Para-alpine skiing	Men's giant slalom standing	18 January
Silver	Noé Petit	Snowboarding	Men's big air	19 January
Silver	Félicie Chappaz; Manon Favre Bonin; Julie Marciniak; France Pignot	Cross-country skiing	Women's 4 × 7.5 km relay	21 January
Bronze	Louison Accambray	Alpine skiing	Women's alpine combined	15 January
Bronze	Jules Segers	Para-alpine skiing	Men's super-g standing	16 January
Bronze	Jonas Skabar	Alpine skiing	Men's super-g	17 January
Bronze	Louison Accambray	Alpine skiing	Women's super-g	17 January
Bronze	Amélie Cancel	Freestyle skiing	Women's freeski slopestyle	17 January
Bronze	Liam Garandel	Snowboarding	Men's slopestyle	17 January
Bronze	Oscar Burnham	Para-alpine skiing	Men's giant slalom standing	18 January
Bronze	Félicie Chappaz; Hugo Serot	Cross-country skiing	Mixed sprint team	19 January
Bronze	Amélie Cancel	Freestyle skiing	Women's freeski big air	19 January
Bronze	Eliott Robin-Saje	Ski mountaineering	Women's vertical race	19 January
Bronze	Louison Accambray; Paul Silvestre; Marjolaine Ollier; Jonas Skabar	Alpine skiing	Mixed team parallel	20 January
Bronze	Paul Fontaine	Biathlon	Men's 12.5 km pursuit	20 January
Bronze	Paul Silvestre	Alpine skiing	Men's slalom	22 January
Bronze	Aurélie Lévêque; Cloé Ollivier; Eva Grenouilloux; Bérénice Comby	Short track speed skating	Women's 3000 m relay	23 January

== Competitors ==
At the 2025 Winter World University Games was participated 72 athletes.

Sport	Men	Women	Total
Alpine skiing	7	4	11
Biathlon	3	3	6
Cross-country skiing	4	4	8
Figure skating	4	3	7
Freestyle skiing	5	4	9
Para-alpine skiing	3	1	4
Short track speed skating	4	4	8
Ski mountaineering	6	4	10
Snowboarding	6	3	9
Total	42	30	72

Athlete	Date of birth	Sport	University	Sex
Louison Accambray	2 October 2001	Alpine skiing	University of Colorado Boulder	F
Mathis Authier	9 November 2006	Snowboarding	University of Perpignan Via Domitia	M
Étienne Bastier	16 February 2004	Short track speed skating	Grenoble Alpes University	M
Simon Bastier	18 April 2006	Short track speed skating	Grenoble Alpes University	M
Arthur Bauchet	10 October 2000	Para-alpine skiing	Grenoble Alpes University	M
Adrien Baylac	22 February 2003	Biathlon	Grenoble Alpes University	M
Eva Bernard	9 March 2005	Figure skating	Grenoble Alpes University	F
Jeremy Boiston	25 January 2005	Freestyle skiing	Université Savoie Mont Blanc	M
Amédeo Bonetto	21 November 2003	Figure skating	Grenoble Alpes University	M
Jonathan Boyer	9 November 2006	Freestyle skiing	Université Savoie Mont Blanc	M
Amélie Broutier	3 August 2003	Biathlon	Grenoble Alpes University	F
Oscar Burnham	30 April 1999	Para-alpine skiing	National School of Skiing and Mountaineering	M
Félix Caillot	24 November 2004	Cross-country skiing	Grenoble Alpes University	M
Amélie Cancel	24 May 2005	Freestyle skiing	Université Savoie Mont Blanc	F
Rémi Cantan	13 September 2002	Ski mountaineering	Grenoble Alpes University	M
Félicie Chappaz	5 April 2002	Cross-country skiing	Université Savoie Mont Blanc	F
Emy Charbonnier	8 September 2005	Alpine skiing	Grenoble Alpes University	F
Zoé Colombier	18 July 2004	Snowboarding	Sciences Po	F
Bérénice Comby	30 May 2006	Short track speed skating	Aix-Marseille University	F
Titouan Cottret	25 September 2003	Snowboarding	Université Savoie Mont Blanc	M
Ulysse Crétin	17 May 2002	Alpine skiing	EDHEC Business School	M
Fantine Degroote	10 December 2001	Freestyle skiing	Grenoble School of Management	F
Marie Duaux	27 April 2004	Freestyle skiing	Université Savoie Mont Blanc	F
Bazil Ducouret	20 March 2002	Ski mountaineering	Grenoble Alpes University	M
Louna Dupont	10 April 2002	Ski mountaineering	Grenoble Institute of Political Studies	F
Manon Favre Bonin	3 December 2004	Cross-country skiing	Université Savoie Mont Blanc	F
Paul Fontaine	7 January 2000	Biathlon	Grenoble Alpes University	M
Robin Galindo-Pillaud	21 April 2000	Ski mountaineering	Grenoble School of Management	M
Liam Garandel	28 April 2006	Snowboarding	CNED Lyon	M
Pablo Giner	1 June 2001	Ski mountaineering	Grenoble Institute of Political Studies	M
Eva Grenouilloux	9 July 2004	Short track speed skating	Grenoble Alpes University	F
Pablo Guichon	9 November 2004	Freestyle skiing	University of Perpignan Via Domitia	M
Samy Hammi	24 March 2002	Figure skating	CNED Lyon	M
Guillaume Herpin	10 March 2001	Snowboarding	Université Savoie Mont Blanc	M
Margaux Herpin	10 February 2003	Snowboarding	Grenoble Alpes University	F
Antoine Lanne	23 July 2004	Cross-country skiing	Université Savoie Mont Blanc	M
Thomas Lardon	13 February 2001	Alpine skiing	Grenoble School of Management	M
Aurélie Lévêque	14 July 2001	Short track speed skating	STUDI	F
Jules Llorach	9 June 2003	Alpine skiing	Université Savoie Mont Blanc	M
Julie Marciniak	29 September 2003	Cross-country skiing	Grenoble Alpes University	F
Clémence Mayindu	7 April 2004	Figure skating	Ecole d'Assas	F
Cloé Merloz	8 August 2003	Alpine skiing	EDHEC Business School	F
Marjolaine Ollier	23 January 2003	Alpine skiing	Grenoble Alpes University	F
Cloé Ollivier	4 February 2004	Short track speed skating	Grenoble Alpes University	F
Max Paget	28 January 2002	Alpine skiing	Université Savoie Mont Blanc	M
Nathanael Peaquin	6 May 2004	Biathlon	Aix-Marseille University	M
Noé Perron	18 November 2000	Figure skating	CREPS Auvergne-Rhône-Alpes	M
Noé Petit	20 April 2004	Snowboarding	INSEEC Chambéry	M
Hugo Picouet	27 June 2005	Freestyle skiing	University of Perpignan Via Domitia	M
France Pignot	3 June 2003	Cross-country skiing	Université Savoie Mont Blanc	F
Camille Poulat	25 June 2004	Snowboarding	Grenoble Alpes University	F
Margot Ravinel	7 June 2002	Ski mountaineering	Institut national des sciences appliquées de Lyon	F
Jules Raybaud	30 June 2004	Ski mountaineering	Université Savoie Mont Blanc	M
Noémie Remonnay	5 April 2001	Biathlon	Claude Bernard University Lyon 1	F
Aurélie Richard	15 June 2005	Para-alpine skiing	Grenoble Alpes University	F
Eliott Robin-Saje	6 April 2004	Ski mountaineering	Grenoble Institute of Political Studies	M
Loanne Roussillon	20 September 2004	Ski mountaineering	Grenoble Alpes University	F
Jules Segers	18 November 2002	Para-alpine skiing	Université Savoie Mont Blanc	M
Hugo Serot	3 March 2004	Cross-country skiing		M
Lisa Siberchicot	12 August 2002	Biathlon	Grenoble Alpes University	F
Paul Silvestre	5 February 2003	Alpine skiing	Grenoble Alpes University	M
Jonas Skabar	16 November 2004	Alpine skiing	Grenoble Alpes University	M
Quentin Sodogas	9 February 2002	Snowboarding	Université Savoie Mont Blanc	M
Clément Talayrach	11 January 2003	Alpine skiing	Grenoble Alpes University	M
Franck Tekam	6 September 2006	Short track speed skating	Lycée Voltaire (Orléans)	M
Antoine Tene	9 December 2006	Freestyle skiing	Université Savoie Mont Blanc	M
Lou Terreaux	14 April 2002	Figure skating	Lumière University Lyon 2	F
Tawan Thomas	7 July 2004	Short track speed skating	Grenoble Alpes University	M
Victoire Tillier	3 September 2002	Freestyle skiing	Grenoble School of Management	F
Louise Trincaz	10 September 2004	Ski mountaineering	Educatel	F
Xavier Vauclin	4 June 2000	Figure skating	Grenoble Alpes University	M
Ugo Zanellato	12 July 2004	Cross-country skiing	Université Savoie Mont Blanc	M
