= Japan at the 2025 Winter World University Games =

- IOC code: JPN
- NOC: Japanese University Sport Board

in Turin, Italy 13 January 2025 – 23 January 2025
- Competitors: 111 in 10 sports
- Flag bearers: Riri Noro, Shota Moriguchi
- Medals Ranked 4th: Gold 7 Silver 8 Bronze 4 Total 19

Winter Universiade appearances (overview)
- 1960; 1962; 1964; 1966; 1968; 1972; 1978; 1981; 1983; 1985; 1987; 1989; 1991; 1993; 1995; 1997; 1999; 2001; 2003; 2005; 2007; 2009; 2011; 2013; 2015; 2017; 2019; 2023; 2025

Japan competed at the 2025 Winter World University Games in Turin, Italy, from 13 to 23 January 2025.

== Medalists ==
| Medal | Name | Sport | Event | Date |
|---|---|---|---|---|
| Gold | Shima Kawaoka | Freestyle skiing | Men's dual moguls | 15 January |
| Gold | Yuma Kagiyama | Figure skating | Men's singles | 18 January |
| Gold | Rion Sumiyoshi | Figure skating | Women's singles | 18 January |
| Gold | Ryoji Fujiya | Snowboarding | Men's big air | 19 January |
| Gold | Sho Kasahara; Ikuya Takizawa; Daito Yamazaki; Kanta Sakai | Cross-country skiing | Men's 4 x 7.5 km relay | 21 January |
| Gold | Takayuki Koyama | Alpine skiing | Men's slalom | 22 January |
| Gold | Yuina Miura; Kohane Tsuruga; Eri Ogihara; Rin Suzuki; Ai Matsunaga | Curling | Women's team | 23 January |
| Silver | Shugo Kanno | Freestyle skiing | Men's moguls | 14 January |
| Silver | Haruka Nakao | Freestyle skiing | Women's moguls | 14 January |
| Silver | Mone Chiba | Figure skating | Women's singles | 18 January |
| Silver | Chika Honda; Takane Tochitani; Karen Hatakeyama; Kaho Nakajima | Cross-country skiing | Women's 4 x 7.5 km relay | 21 January |
| Silver | Sora Sasaoka | Freestyle skiing | Men's ski cross | 22 January |
| Silver | Shogo Miyata | Short track speed skating | Men's 500 m | 22 January |
| Silver | Daito Yamazaki | Cross-country skiing | Men's 20 km mass start classic | 23 January |
| Silver | Mikihiro Inoue; Shogo Miyata; Daito Ochi; Kei Shimmura | Short track speed skating | Men's 5000 m relay | 23 January |
| Bronze | Marin Ito | Freestyle skiing | Women's dual moguls | 15 January |
| Bronze | Yuka Chujo; Yu Hatade; Anju Hayakawa; Shieru Higuchi; Minami Kamada; Hana Kitajima; Sarasa Kishibe; Sakura Kitamura; Ruka Kiyokawa; Kiku Kobayashi; Komomo Ito; Sakura Ito; Riko Matsumoto; Marin Nagaoka; Haruna Nomura; Riri Noro; Ami Sasaki; Kaho Suzuki; Masaki Tanabe; Ayaka Tomiuchi; Kyoka Tsutsumi; Momoka Yamamoto; Aiko Yoshikawa | Ice hockey | Women's tournaments | 20 January |
| Bronze | Noa Kanazawa | Snowboarding | Women's parallel giant slalom | 21 January |
| Bronze | Yamato Asakawa | Freestyle skiing | Men's ski cross | 22 January |

== Competitors ==
At the 2025 Winter World University Games was participated 111 athletes. Riri Noro and Shota Moriguchi became a flag bearers.

| Sport | Men | Women | Total |
|---|---|---|---|
| Alpine skiing | 3 | 3 | 6 |
| Biathlon | 1 | 1 | 2 |
| Cross-country skiing | 5 | 4 | 9 |
| Curling | 1 | 6 | 7 |
| Figure skating | 3 | 3 | 6 |
| Freestyle skiing | 4 | 4 | 8 |
| Ice hockey | 23 | 23 | 46 |
| Short track speed skating | 5 | 5 | 10 |
| Ski orienteering | 1 | 1 | 2 |
| Snowboarding | 9 | 5 | 14 |
| Total | 55 | 55 | 110 |
