= Canada at the 2025 Winter World University Games =

- IOC code: CAN
- NOC: U SPORTS Canada

in Turin, Italy 13 January 2025 – 23 January 2025
- Competitors: 112 (59 men and 53 women) in 8 sports
- Flag bearers: Catherine Clifford (curling); Kai Edmonds (ice hockey)
- Medals Ranked 18th: Gold 1 Silver 2 Bronze 6 Total 9

Winter Universiade appearances
- 1960; 1962; 1964; 1966; 1968; 1972; 1978; 1981; 1983; 1985; 1987; 1989; 1991; 1993; 1995; 1997; 1999; 2001; 2003; 2005; 2007; 2009; 2011; 2013; 2015; 2017; 2019; 2023; 2025

Canada competed at the 2025 Winter World University Games in Turin, Italy, from 13 to 23 January 2025.

== Medallists ==
Canada finished on the eighteenth place in the medal table with nine medals.

Medal	Name	Sport	Event	Date
Gold	M Bizier; C Bowie; C Callaghan; B Corbeil; J Duff; K Edmonds; C Frenette; M Gagnon; C Gengenbach; K Henry; M Huchette; S Huo / N Hutcheson; L Keeler; F Lapenna; S Lavigne; J Lee; S Mutala; K McCallum; K Pearson; L Rafanomezantsoa; S Richard; W Rouleau	Ice hockey	Men	22 January
Silver	Amy McCarthy	Snowboarding	Women's snowboard slopestyle	17 January
Silver	G Beer; AA Boyer; M Desmarais; M Dominico; S Gaskell; L Herrfort; A Jomha; M Keenan; É Lavoie; É Lussier; A MacKenzie / J Magoffin; S Mercier; E Pelowich; E Plourde; E Potter; K Ross; G Santerre; A Spence; J Verbeek; S Watkins Southwardx	Ice hockey	Women	20 January
Bronze	Jessica Zheng; Victor Pietrangelo	Curling	Mixed doubles	14 January
Bronze	Quinn Dawson	Freestyle skiing	Men's moguls	14 January
Bronze	Charles Lecours	Para-cross-country skiing	Men's sprint classic technique standing	17 January
Bronze	Amy McCarthy	Snowboarding	Women's snowboard big air	19 January
Bronze	Serena Gray-Withers; Catherine Clifford; Brianna Cullen; Zoe Cinnamon; Gracelyn Richards	Curling	Women	22 January
Bronze	Sage Stefani	Freestyle skiing	Women's ski cross	22 January

== Competitors ==
At the 2025 Winter World University Games was participated 112 athletes. Catherine Clifford (curling) and Kai Edmonds (ice hockey) were a flag bearers at the opening ceremony.

Sport	Men	Women	Total
Alpine skiing	5	6	11
Biathlon	6	6	12
Cross-country skiing	8	8	16
Curling	5	6	11
Freestyle skiing	8	4	12
Ice hockey	23	21	44
Para-cross-country skiing	1	0	1
Snowboarding	3	2	5
Total	59	53	112
