= Luisa Grube =

German paraclimber (born 2001)

Personal information
- Born: 20 May 2001 (age 25) Göttingen, Germany
- Home town: Innsbruck, Austria

Sport
- Country: Germany
- Sport: Paraclimbing
- Disability: Visually impaired
- Disability class: B2
Medal record
Representing Germany
Women's paraclimbing
World Championships
Bronze medal – third place	2025 Seoul	B2
Women's para-alpine skiing
World University Games
Silver medal – second place	2025 Turin	Giant slalom

Luisa Grube (born 20 May 2001) is a German visually impaired paraclimber and former para-alpine skier

== Career ==
In January 2025, Grube competed at the 2025 Winter World University Games in para-alpine skiing and won a silver medal in the giant slalom event with a time of 2:58.40. She announced that challenges in finding a guide led to her decision to retire from competitive skiing, allowing her to focus on paraclimbing.

In September 2025, she competed at the 2025 IFSC Paraclimbing World Championships and won a bronze medal in the B2 event. Grube and Linda Le Bon both reached hold 37+, but due to her better qualification performance Le Bon won the silver medal.
