= 2021 IFSC Paraclimbing World Championships =

Biennial competition climbing event

2021 World Championships
- Venue: 2
- Location: Moscow, Russia
- Dates: 15–17 September 2021
- Competitors: 120 from 20 nations

The 2021 IFSC Paraclimbing World Championships was the 7th edition of its kind of the leading biennial global championships in competition climbing for athletes with a disability or impairment.

The event was held in Moscow, Russia from 15 to 17 September 2021, alongside the 2021 IFSC Climbing World Championships, it included a total of 13 Lead events for the respective athlete's impairment classification. Two venues were used during the championships: the Irina Viner-Usmanova Gymnastics Palace and the Athletics and Football Sport Complex "CSKA".

== Medal table ==
* Host nation (Russia)

Rank	Nation	Gold	Silver	Bronze	Total
1	France	4	1	1	6
2	Japan	3	0	1	4
3	Great Britain	2	3	2	7
4	Romania	1	2	0	3
5	Austria	1	1	1	3
6	Belgium	1	1	0	2
7	Israel	1	0	0	1
8	United States	0	3	0	3
9	Netherlands	0	1	0	1
9	Slovenia	0	1	0	1
11	Germany	0	0	2	2
11	Italy	0	0	2	2
11	Spain	0	0	2	2
14	India	0	0	1	1
14	Iran	0	0	1	1
Totals (15 entries)		13	13	13	39

== Medal summary ==
In a world championship, at least six athletes and four nations must enter each category. Because of insufficient registrations several competitions had to be merged. As B3 cannot be merged with any other category, they were instead held as Masters.

The medals were awarded as follows:

Event	Gold	Silver	Bronze
Men's Lead B1	(Japan) Sho Aita	(Romania) Răzvan Nedu	(United Kingdom) Jesse Dufton
Men's Lead B2	(Japan) Fumiya Hamanoue	(United Kingdom) Richard Slocock	(Spain) Raul Simon Franco
Men's Lead B3 (Masters)	(Japan) Kazuhiro Minowada	(Romania) Cosmin Florin Candoi	(United Kingdom) Lux Losey Sail
Men's Lead AL-1	in RP-1		
Men's Lead AL-2	(France) Thierry Delarue	(Belgium) Frederik Leys	(Japan) Shuhei Yuki
Men's Lead AU-1	in AU-2		
Men's Lead AU-2 (forearm amputee)	(United Kingdom) Matthew Phillips	(United States) Brian Zarzuela	(Germany) Kevin Bartke
Men's Lead RP-1	(Austria) Angelino Zeller	(United States) Tanner Cislaw	(Germany) Korbinian Franck
Men's Lead RP-2	(Israel) Mor Michael Sapir	(United States) Benjamin Mayforth	(France) Bastien Thomas
Men's Lead RP-3	(France) Romain Pagnoux	(France) Mathieu Besnard	(Iran) Iman Edrisi
Women's Lead B1	in B2		
Women's Lead B2	(United Kingdom) Abigail Robinson	(Austria) Edith Scheinecker	(Italy) Nadia Bredice
Women's Lead B3 (Masters)	(Romania) Ionela Grecu	(Slovenia) Tanja Glusic	(India) Sunita Dhondappanavar
Women's Lead AL-1	in RP-1		
Women's Lead AL-2	in RP-3		
Women's Lead AU-1	in RP-1		
Women's Lead AU-2 (forearm amputee)	in RP-1		
Women's Lead RP-1	(Belgium) Pavitra Vandenhoven	(Netherlands) Eva Mol	(Spain) Marta Peche Salinero
Women's Lead RP-2	(France) Solenne Piret	(United Kingdom) Leanora Volpe	(Italy) Lucia Capovilla
Women's Lead RP-3	(France) Lucie Jarrige	(United Kingdom) Martha Evans	(Austria) Katharina Ritt
