= Linda Le Bon =

Austrian paraclimber / Belgian para-skier

Personal information
- Nationality: Austrian, former Belgian
- Born: 20 July 1964 (age 62) Wilrijk, Belgium
- Website: https://lindalebon.com
Medal record
Representing Belgium
Women's para-alpine skiing
World Para Snow Sports Championships
Silver medal – second place	2021 Lillehammer	Downhill
Silver medal – second place	2021 Lillehammer	Super-G
Representing Austria
Women's paraclimbing
Paraclimbing World Championships
Silver medal – second place	2025 Seoul	B2
Paraclimbing World Cup
Gold medal – first place	2025 Salt Lake City	B2
Gold medal – first place	2024 Arco	B2
Gold medal – first place	2024 Innsbruck	B2
Silver medal – second place	2023 Villars	B2
Bronze medal – third place	2024 Villars	B2

Linda Le Bon (born 20 July 1964) is a para-athlete who represents Austria in competition climbing in paraclimbing, and previously competed for her native country Belgium in para-alpine skiing. She competes in the B2 category, which is for visually impaired athletes. She has a vision impairment as a result of macular degeneration.

== Career ==
=== Alpine skiing ===
Le Bon competed at the 2021 World Para Snow Sports Championships held in Lillehammer, Norway, winning the silver medal in the downhill and super-G events. Her sight guide for skiing was nominally Pierre Couquelet.

Le Bon and her sighted guide and daughter Ulla Gilot qualified to represent Belgium at the 2022 Winter Paralympics held in Beijing, China. Couquelet was originally scheduled to be Le Bon's sighted guide but he was not able to compete as her guide after failing a doping test due to an administrative error related to medication that he takes. Le Bon competed in five alpine skiing events. She was the flag bearer for Belgium during the closing ceremony. After a knee injury, Linda stopped competing in paraskiing and is now focusing on paraclimbing.

=== Competition climbing ===
Le Bon lives in Taxach-Rif in the Hallein District close to Salzburg in Austria and competes for the Austrian Climbing Federation in competition climbing.

She had her competitive debut at the 2023 IFSC Paraclimbing World Cup in Innsbruck where she finished fourth, being merged into the harder B3 category. She won her first medal the following event in Villars, reaching second place in the B3 category. She also competed at the 2023 IFSC Paraclimbing World Championships, reaching fourth place. In the 2024 season, she won her first gold medal (B2) in Innsbruck, after coming in sixth (B3) at the first competition in Salt Lake City where categories were also merged. At the IFSC European Championships in Villars-sur-Ollon 2024, she could claim a bronze medal. She finished off here season with her second gold medal in Arco (Italy) on 28.09.2024.

Starting into the 2025 season, she could secure her third Austrian National Champion's title and won the first IFSC Para Climbing World Cup of the season in Salt Lake City.
