= Great Britain paraclimbing team =

- Sport: Competition climbing
- Location: United Kingdom
- Head coach: Robin O'Leary; Belinda Fuller
- Main sponsor: Oakwood Climbing Centre; Quay Climbing Centre
- Parent group: British Mountaineering Council
- Website: http://www.gbclimbingteam.co.uk/paraclimbing

The Great Britain paraclimbing team represents Great Britain in paraclimbing. They are administered by the British Mountaineering Council, and currently sponsored by the Oakwood Climbing Centre and Quay Climbing Centre. In 2018 the team had their best season ever coming 2nd in the IFSC Climbing World Championships Paraclimbing medal table with 3 World Champions gaining Gold, a Silver and a Bronze medal.

== Current team ==
- Abigail Robinson (B2)
- Anita Aggarwal (RP3)
- Leanora Volpe (RP3)
- Martha Evans (RP3)
- Joanna Newton (AL2)
- Isabella Walsh (AU2)
- Sebastian Musson (AU2)
- James Rudge (AU2)
- Jesse Dufton (B1)
- Richard Slocock (B2)
- Lux Losey (B3)
- Alex Thraxton (AL2)
- John Shields (AL2)
- Stuart Sneddon (AL2)
- Alex Downes (RP1)
- Pete McCarthy (RP1)
- Kenneth Ellacott (RP2)
- Laurence Morgan (RP2)
- Luke Jaimeson (RP2)
- Luke Smith (RP3)
- Matt White (RP3)

== Coaches ==
- Robin O'Leary
- Belinda Fuller

== Successes ==
2018 World Paraclimbing Championships, Innsbruck 5 Podiums inc 3 World Champions.

2019 World Paraclimbing Championships, Briançon 9 podiums inc all defending World Champions retained their title.

Medal Results
| Year | Competition | Gold | Silver | Bronze | Total |
|---|---|---|---|---|---|
| 2018 | IFSC Paraclimbing World Championships, Innsbruck | 3 | 1 | 1 | 5 |
| 2019 | IFSC Paraclimbing World Championships, Briançon | 3 | 3 | 3 | 9 |
| 2021 | 2021 IFSC Paraclimbing World Championships, Moscow | 2 | 3 | 2 | 7 |
