= The Golden Rabbit =

1962 British film by David MacDonald

- Directed by: David MacDonald
- Screenplay by: Gerald Kelsey
- Produced by: Barry Delmaine
- Starring: Timothy Bateson; Maureen Beck; John Sharp
- Cinematography: S.D. Onions
- Edited by: Alan Morrison
- Music by: Bill McGuffie
- Production company: Argo Films
- Release date: 1962
- Running time: 64 minutes
- Country: United Kingdom
- Language: English

The Golden Rabbit is a 1962 British comedy film directed by David MacDonald and starring Timothy Bateson, Maureen Beck and Willoughby Goddard.

== Plot ==
A bank clerk attempts to become wealthy by manufacturing gold.

== Cast ==
- Timothy Bateson as Henry Tucker
- Maureen Beck as Sally
- Willoughby Goddard as Clitheroe
- Dick Bentley as Inspector Jackson
- John Sharp as Peebles
- Kenneth Fortescue as Wilson
- Raymond Rollett as manager

== Critical reception ==
The Monthly Film Bulletin wrote: "A mildly amusing joke, dismally told and drearily over-acted. The scripting and direction are well-matched in witlessness"
