= Vigh =

Vigh is a Hungarian surname. Notable people with the surname include:

- Dalton Vigh (born 1964), Brazilian actor
- László Vigh (born 1961), Hungarian politician
- Melinda Vigh (1982–2021), Hungarian climber
- Tibor Vigh (born 1941), Hungarian-Canadian soccer player
