= 2024 IFSC Paraclimbing World Cup =

- Organiser: IFSC
- Edition: 12th
- Events: 90: 3 B1 3 B2 3 B3 3 AU2 3 AU3 3 AL1 3 AL2 3 RP1 3 RP2 3 RP3
- Locations: 3: Salt Lake City Innsbruck Arco
- Dates: 7 May – 28 September 2024

The IFSC Paraclimbing World Cup 2024 is the twelfth season of the paraclimbing world cup series by the International Federation of Sport Climbing. Two of the three events are held alongside the 2024 IFSC Climbing World Cup.

== Procedure ==
Athletes compete in lead climbing only. Each category must feature at least four competitors from three nations for a competition to take place. If these minimums are not reached, categories may be merged into other, more difficult formats.

=== Dates ===
- 7 – 8 May in (United States) Salt Lake City
- 24 – 25 June in (Austria) Innsbruck
- 27 – 28 September in (Italy) Arco

== Results ==
As opposed to the open class, there is no ranking across the season.

=== Women ===
B1	Competition	First	Second	Third
B1	(United States) Salt Lake City	in B3		
B1	(Austria) Innsbruck	(Italy) Nadia Bredice	(United States) Emeline Lakrout	(Switzerland) Laila Grillo
B1	(Italy) Arco	(Italy) Nadia Bredice	(United States) Emeline Lakrout	(Switzerland) Laila Grillo

B2	Competition	First	Second	Third
B2	(United States) Salt Lake City	in B3		
B2	(Austria) Innsbruck	(Austria) Linda Le Bon	(United States) Seneida Biendarra	(Germany) Ivon Lawerenz
B2	(Italy) Arco	(Austria) Linda Le Bon	(Germany) Ivon Lawerenz	(Austria) Edith Scheinecker

B3	Competition	First	Second	Third
B3	(United States) Salt Lake City	(United States) Phoebe Barkan	(United States) Seneida Biendarra	(Germany) Ivon Lawerenz
B3	(Austria) Innsbruck	(United States) Linn Poston	(France) Elsa Boutel Menard	(Romania) Ionela Dragan
B3	(Italy) Arco	no registrations		

AL1	Competition	First	Second	Third
AL1	(United States) Salt Lake City	in RP1		
AL1	(Austria) Innsbruck	in RP1		
AL1	(Italy) Arco	in RP1		

AL2	Competition	First	Second	Third
AL2	(United States) Salt Lake City	(France) Lucie Jarrige	(Australia) Sarah Larcombe	(United States) Morgan Loomis
AL2	(Austria) Innsbruck	(France) Lucie Jarrige	(United States) Morgan Loomis	(Portugal) Tânia Chaves
AL2	(Italy) Arco	(France) Lucie Jarrige	(Australia) Sarah Larcombe	(United States) Cail Soria

AU2	Competition	First	Second	Third
AU2	(United States) Salt Lake City	(France) Solenne Piret	(Italy) Lucia Capovilla	(United States) Eleanor Rubin
AU2	(Austria) Innsbruck	(France) Solenne Piret	(Italy) Lucia Capovilla	(United States) Eleanor Rubin
AU2	(Italy) Arco	(Italy) Lucia Capovilla	(United States) Eleanor Rubin	(Germany) Carolin Heberle

AU3	Competition	First	Second	Third
AU3	(United States) Salt Lake City	in RP3		
AU3	(Austria) Innsbruck	(Germany) Rosalie Schaupert	(Slovenia) Manca Smrekar	(Germany) Ria Grindel
AU3	(Italy) Arco	(Germany) Rosalie Schaupert	(Spain) Paula De La Calle Pizarro	(Slovenia) Manca Smrekar

RP1	Competition	First	Second	Third
RP1	(United States) Salt Lake City	in RP2		
RP1	(Austria) Innsbruck	(Belgium) Pavitra Vandenhoven	(Spain) Marta Peche Salinero	(Netherlands) Eva Mol
RP1	(Italy) Arco	(United States) Melissa Ruiz	(Switzerland) Sarah Longhi	(Netherlands) Eva Mol

RP2	Competition	First	Second	Third
RP2	(United States) Salt Lake City	(Austria) Jasmin Plank	(Norway) Dina Eivik	(United States) Emily Seelenfreund
RP2	(Austria) Innsbruck	(Italy) Chiara Cavina	(Austria) Jasmin Plank	(Norway) Dina Eivik
RP2	(Italy) Arco	(Norway) Dina Eivik	(Austria) Jasmin Plank	(Italy) Chiara Cavina

RP3	Competition	First	Second	Third
RP3	(United States) Salt Lake City	(United States) Nat Vorel	(Brazil) Marina Dias	(Slovenia) Manca Smrekar
RP3	(Austria) Innsbruck	(United States) Nat Vorel	(United Kingdom) Anita Aggarwal	(Italy) Elisa Martin
RP3	(Italy) Arco	(Netherlands) Christiane Luttikhuizen	(United Kingdom) Anita Aggarwal	(United States) Laura Heaton

=== Men ===
B1	Competition	First	Second	Third
B1	(United States) Salt Lake City	(Japan) Sho Aita	(Spain) Francisco Javier Aguilar Amoedo	(Romania) Razvan Nedu
B1	(Austria) Innsbruck	(Japan) Sho Aita	(Spain) Francisco Javier Aguilar Amoedo	(Switzerland) Roland Paillex
B1	(Italy) Arco	in B2		

B2	Competition	First	Second	Third
B2	(United States) Salt Lake City	in B3		
B2	(Austria) Innsbruck	(Romania) Razvan Nedu	(Japan) Fumiya Hamanoue	(Spain) Guillermo Pelegrín Gómez
B2	(Italy) Arco	(Romania) Razvan Nedu	(Spain) Francisco Javier Aguilar Amoedo	(Japan) Fumiya Hamanoue

B3	Competition	First	Second	Third
B3	(United States) Salt Lake City	(Japan) Fumiya Hamanoue	(Spain) Guillermo Pelegrín Gómez	(United States) Andrew Martinez
B3	(Austria) Innsbruck	(Romania) Cosmin Florin Candoi	(Japan) Kazuhiro Minowada	(Romania) Daniel-Bebe-Vasilică Andrei
B3	(Italy) Arco	(Romania) Cosmin Florin Candoi	(United Kingdom) Lux Losey Sail	(Japan) Kazuhiro Minowada

AL1	Competition	First	Second	Third
AL1	(United States) Salt Lake City	(Austria) Angelino Zeller	(United States) Tanner Cislaw	(Austria) Markus Pösendorfer
AL1	(Austria) Innsbruck	(Austria) Angelino Zeller	(Austria) Markus Pösendorfer	(United States) Tanner Cislaw
AL1	(Italy) Arco	(Austria) Markus Pösendorfer	(Japan) Naohisa Hatakeyama	

AL2	Competition	First	Second	Third
AL2	(United States) Salt Lake City	(Italy) David Kammerer	(United States) Ethan Zilz	(Japan) Shuhei Yuki
AL2	(Austria) Innsbruck	(United States) Ethan Zilz	(Spain) Iván Germán Pascual	(Belgium) Frederik Leys
AL2	(Italy) Arco	(France) Thierry Delarue	(Spain) Iván Germán Pascual	(Spain) Albert Guardia Ferrer

AU2	Competition	First	Second	Third
AU2	(United States) Salt Lake City	(Germany) Kevin Bartke	(United States) Brian Zerzuela	(United States) Trevor Smith
AU2	(Austria) Innsbruck	(Germany) Kevin Bartke	(United States) Brian Zerzuela	(Norway) Isak Ripman
AU2	(Italy) Arco	(United States) Brian Zerzuela	(Germany) Kevin Bartke	(United Kingdom) Sebastian Musson

AU3	Competition	First	Second	Third
AU3	(United States) Salt Lake City	(Switzerland) Dominic Geisseler	(Romania) Liviu-Nicolae Matei	(Canada) Shamus Boulianne
AU3	(Austria) Innsbruck	(Switzerland) Dominic Geisseler	(Israel) Mor Michael Sapir	(Romania) Liviu-Nicolae Matei
AU3	(Italy) Arco	(Switzerland) Dominic Geisseler	(Romania) Liviu-Nicolae Matei	(Israel) Mor Michael Sapir

RP1	Competition	First	Second	Third
RP1	(United States) Salt Lake City	(Germany) Korbinian Franck	(France) Aloïs Pottier	(Australia) Glen Todd
RP1	(Austria) Innsbruck	(Norway) Kim Rishaug	(France) Aloïs Pottier	(Germany) Korbinian Franck
RP1	(Italy) Arco	(Germany) Korbinian Franck	(France) Aloïs Pottier	(Norway) Kim Rishaug

RP2	Competition	First	Second	Third
RP2	(United States) Salt Lake City	(Spain) Iván Muñoz Escolar	(United States) Benjamin Mayforth	(Germany) Philipp Hrozek
RP2	(Austria) Innsbruck	(India) Manikandan Kumar	(United States) Benjamin Mayforth	(United States) Brayden Butler
RP2	(Italy) Arco	(India) Manikandan Kumar	(United States) Benjamin Mayforth	(Switzerland) Xavier Rithner

RP3	Competition	First	Second	Third
RP3	(United States) Salt Lake City	(Japan) Tadashi Takano	(United Kingdom) Luke Smith	(Brazil) Igor Jean Silva Mesquita
RP3	(Austria) Innsbruck	(Japan) Tadashi Takano	(Netherlands) Jamie Barendrecht	(Belgium) Camille Caulier
RP3	(Italy) Arco	(Japan) Tadashi Takano	(Belgium) Camille Caulier	(Netherlands) Jamie Barendrecht
