= 2025 IFSC Paraclimbing World Championships =

Biennial competition climbing event

- Venue: KSPO Dome
- Location: Seoul, South Korea
- Date: 20 – 25 September 2025
- Website: 2025 Paraclimbing WC

The 2025 IFSC Paraclimbing World Championships was the 9th edition of the leading biennial global championships in competition climbing for athletes with a disability or impairment.

The event was held at the KSPO Dome in Seoul, South Korea from 20 to 25 September 2025, alongside the 2025 IFSC Climbing World Championships. It crowned world champions in a total of 19 competition lead climbing events for the respective athlete's impairment classification. Featuring 206 athletes, the event was the largest paraclimbing competition to date.

== Medal table ==
* Host nation (South Korea)

| Rank | Nation | Gold | Silver | Bronze | Total |
|---|---|---|---|---|---|
| 1 | United States | 5 | 2 | 5 | 12 |
| 2 | Japan | 4 | 3 | 3 | 10 |
| 3 | France | 4 | 0 | 3 | 7 |
| 4 | Germany | 2 | 1 | 2 | 5 |
| 5 | Romania | 2 | 0 | 1 | 3 |
| 6 | Austria | 1 | 3 | 0 | 4 |
| 7 | Brazil | 1 | 1 | 0 | 2 |
| 8 | Italy | 0 | 2 | 0 | 2 |
| 9 | Slovenia | 0 | 1 | 2 | 3 |
| 10 | Netherlands | 0 | 1 | 1 | 2 |
| 11 | Australia | 0 | 1 | 0 | 1 |
| 11 | Belgium | 0 | 1 | 0 | 1 |
| 11 | Hungary | 0 | 1 | 0 | 1 |
| 11 | India | 0 | 1 | 0 | 1 |
| 11 | Spain | 0 | 1 | 0 | 1 |
| 16 | Israel | 0 | 0 | 1 | 1 |
| 16 | Norway | 0 | 0 | 1 | 1 |
| Totals (17 entries) | | 19 | 19 | 19 | 57 |

== Medal summary ==
The medals were awarded as follows:

| Event | Gold | Silver | Bronze |
|---|---|---|---|
| Men's B1 | (Japan) Sho Aita | (Spain) Francisco Javier Aguilar Amoedo | (France) Nicolas Moineau |
| Men's B2 | (Romania) Răzvan Nedu | (Japan) Motohiro Ejiri | (Japan) Fumiya Hamanoue |
| Men's B3 | (Romania) Cosmin Florin Candoi | (Japan) Kazuhiro Minowada | (Romania) Daniel-Bebe-Vasilică Andrei |
| AL1 | (Austria) Angelino Zeller | (Austria) Markus Pösendorfer | (Slovenia) Matej Arh |
| Men's AL2 | (France) Thierry Delarue | (Japan) Shuhei Yuki | (United States) Corey Ramos |
| Men's AU2 | (Germany) Kevin Bartke | (Brazil) Eduardo Miguel Schaus | (United States) Brian Zarzuela |
| Men's AU3 | (Japan) Nobuhiro Yusaraoka | (Hungary) Bence Kerekes | (Israel) Mor Michael Sapir |
| Men's RP1 | (France) Aloïs Pottier | (Germany) Korbinian Franck | (Norway) Kim Rishaug |
| Men's RP2 | (United States) Brayden Butler | (India) Manikandan Kumar | (Germany) Philipp Hrozek |
| Men's RP3 | (Japan) Kazuhiko Yamashita | (Belgium) Camille Caulier | (Netherlands) Jamie Barendrecht |
| Women's B1 | (Japan) Hiromi Aoki | (Italy) Nadia Bredice | (Slovenia) Tanja Glusic |
| Women's B2 | (United States) Seneida Biendarra | (Austria) Linda Le Bon | (Germany) Luisa Grube |
| Women's B3 | (United States) Linn Poston | (United States) Phoebe Barkan | (France) Elsa Boutel Menard |
| Women's AL1 | in AL1 | | |
| Women's AL2 | (France) Lucie Jarrige | (Australia) Sarah Larcombe | (United States) Daliya Hansen |
| Women's AU2 | (France) Solenne Piret | (Italy) Lucia Capovilla | (United States) Eleanor Rubin |
| Women's AU3 | (Germany) Rosalie Schaupert | (Slovenia) Manca Smrekar | (France) Oriane Ilpide |
| Women's RP1 | (United States) Melissa Ruiz | (Netherlands) Eva Mol | (United States) Hannah Zook |
| Women's RP2 | (United States) Emily Seelenfreund | (Austria) Jasmin Plank | (Japan) Matoi Futahashi |
| Women's RP3 | (Brazil) Marina Dias | (United States) Nat Vorel | (Japan) Momoko Yoshida |

== Men's results ==
Men's B1
| Rank | Name | Qualification | | | | | Final |
| Rank | Name | Route 1 | | Route 2 | | Points | Final |
| Rank | Name | Score | Rank | Score | Rank | Points | Final |
|---|---|---|---|---|---|---|---|
| 1 | (Japan) Sho Aita | 50 | 1 | 48+ | 1 | 1.0 | 38+ |
| 2 | (Spain) Francisco Javier Aguilar Amoedo | 31+ | 2 | 35 | 2 | 2.0 | 36 |
| 3 | (France) Nicolas Moineau | 23 | 4 | 31+ | 3 | 3.46 | 28+ |
| 4 | (Italy) Simone Salvagnin | 30+ | 3 | 30 | 4 | 3.46 | 24 |
| 5 | (Japan) Masahito Maeoka | 17 | 5 | 20+ | 5 | 5.0 | – |

Men's B2
| Rank | Name | Qualification | | | | | Final |
| Rank | Name | Route 1 | | Route 2 | | Points | Final |
| Rank | Name | Score | Rank | Score | Rank | Points | Final |
|---|---|---|---|---|---|---|---|
| 1 | (Romania) Răzvan Nedu | 40+ | 1 | 41 | 1 | 1.0 | 36+ |
| 2 | (Japan) Motohiro Ejiri | 31+ | 2 | 35+ | 3 | 2.74 | 28+ |
| 3 | (Japan) Fumiya Hamanoue | 31+ | 2 | 36 | 2 | 2.24 | 24 |
| 4 | (Spain) Guillermo Pelegrín Gómez | 31 | 4 | 31+ | 4 | 4.0 | – |
| 5 | (Japan) Junichi Fujisaku | 24+ | 5 | 30 | 5 | 5.0 | – |
| 6 | (United States) Kevin Chao | 14+ | 6 | 20 | 6 | 6.0 | – |

Men's B3
| Rank | Name | Qualification | | | | | Final |
| Rank | Name | Route 1 | | Route 2 | | Points | Final |
| Rank | Name | Score | Rank | Score | Rank | Points | Final |
|---|---|---|---|---|---|---|---|
| 1 | (Romania) Cosmin Florin Candoi | 50 | 1 | Top | 1 | 1.0 | 40 |
| 2 | (Japan) Kazuhiro Minowada | 40+ | 2 | 40+ | 2 | 2.0 | 35+ |
| 3 | (Romania) Daniel-bebe-vasilică Andrei | 31+ | 3 | 35+ | 3 | 3.24 | 33+ |
| 4 | (Japan) Takumi Kawamura | 31+ | 3 | 31+ | 4 | 3.97 | 28 |
| 5 | (United Kingdom) Lux Losey Sail | 30+ | 5 | 31+ | 4 | 4.74 | – |
| 6 | (United States) Andrew Martinez | 24+ | 6 | 30 | 6 | 6.0 | – |
| 7 | (United States) Gordon Fralick | 19+ | 7 | 22+ | 7 | 7.0 | – |

AL1
| Rank | Name | Qualification | | | | | Final |
| Rank | Name | Route 1 | | Route 2 | | Points | Final |
| Rank | Name | Score | Rank | Score | Rank | Points | Final |
|---|---|---|---|---|---|---|---|
| 1 | (Austria) Angelino Zeller | 38+ | 1 | 47+ | 1 | 1.0 | 47+ |
| 2 | (Austria) Markus Pösendorfer | 31+ | 3 | 42+ | 3 | 3.5 | 42+ |
| 3 | (Slovenia) Matej Arh | 33+ | 2 | 42+ | 3 | 2.65 | 42 |
| 4 | (Belgium) Pavitra Vandenhoven | 16+ | 6 | 45 | 2 | 3.61 | 37+ |
| 5 | (United States) Tanner Cislaw | 31+ | 3 | 41+ | 5 | 4.18 | – |
| 6 | (Australia) Matthew Caruana | 20+ | 5 | 32+ | 8 | 6.32 | – |
| 7 | (Japan) Tetsuo Nishizaki | 16+ | 6 | 34+ | 7 | 6.75 | – |
| 8 | (Slovakia) Marek Dučák | 16 | 8 | 39 | 6 | 7.14 | – |
| 9 | (Japan) Naohisa Hatakeyama | 16 | 8 | 32 | 9 | 8.75 | – |
| 10 | (United States) Brittany Chadbourne | 15+ | 10 | 26+ | 10 | 10.72 | – |
| 11 | (United States) Carlie Cook | 15+ | 10 | 23+ | 11 | 11.25 | – |
| 12 | (United States) Garrison Redd | 15+ | 10 | 17 | 13 | 12.23 | – |
| 13 | (United States) Carlos Guiles | 15+ | 10 | 16 | 14 | 12.69 | – |
| 14 | (United States) Andrea Wilson | 15 | 14 | 23 | 12 | 12.96 | – |

Men's AL2
| Rank | Name | Qualification | | | | | Final |
| Rank | Name | Route 1 | | Route 2 | | Points | Final |
| Rank | Name | Score | Rank | Score | Rank | Points | Final |
|---|---|---|---|---|---|---|---|
| 1 | (France) Thierry Delarue | Top | 1 | Top | 1 | 1.0 | 44+ |
| 2 | (Japan) Shuhei Yuki | 32+ | 2 | 38 | 7 | 4.58 | 34+ |
| 3 | (United States) Corey Ramos | 32+ | 2 | 35+ | 9 | 5.2 | 34 |
| 4 | (Belgium) Frederik Leys | 23+ | 11 | 39 | 2 | 4.69 | 32+ |
| 5 | (United States) Lee Shaffer | 32 | 5 | 38+ | 3 | 4.74 | 32 |
| 6 | (United States) Ethan Zilz | 31+ | 6 | 38+ | 3 | 5.2 | 30+ |
| 7 | (Spain) Iván German Pascual | 27 | 7 | 38+ | 3 | 5.61 | – |
| 8 | (Spain) Urko Carmona Barandiaran | 32+ | 2 | 31+ | 11 | 5.74 | – |
| 9 | (Spain) Albert Guardia Ferrer | 25+ | 8 | 38+ | 3 | 6.18 | – |
| 10 | (Norway) Sebastian Menze | 25+ | 8 | 37+ | 8 | 8.25 | – |
| 11 | (Italy) David Kammerer | 25 | 10 | 33+ | 10 | 10.0 | – |
| 12 | (Japan) Keigo Takahata | 21 | 12 | 26+ | 13 | 12.49 | – |
| 13 | (Japan) Hiromi Ono | 18+ | 13 | 13 | 12 | 12.73 | – |
| 14 | (Romania) Marius Sandu | 18+ | 13 | 24 | 14 | 13.75 | – |
| 15 | (Brazil) Luciano Frazão Da Silva | 18 | 15 | 23 | 15 | 15.25 | – |
| 16 | (United Kingdom) Mat Armitage | 18 | 15 | 21 | 16 | 15.75 | – |
| 17 | (Poland) Krzysztof Kuczewski | 15+ | 17 | 17+ | 17 | 17.25 | – |
| 18 | (United States) Chase Christiansen | 15 | 18 | 17+ | 17 | 17.75 | – |
| 19 | (China) Mingliang He | 12+ | 19 | 15+ | 19 | 19.0 | – |
| 20 | (South Korea) Haesung Cho | 5+ | 20 | 13 | 20 | 20.0 | – |

Men's AU2
| Rank | Name | Qualification | | | | | Final |
| Rank | Name | Route 1 | | Route 2 | | Points | Final |
| Rank | Name | Score | Rank | Score | Rank | Points | Final |
|---|---|---|---|---|---|---|---|
| 1 | (Germany) Kevin Bartke | 27+ | 3 | 50+ | 2 | 2.65 | 35+ |
| 2 | (Brazil) Eduardo Miguel Schaus | 27+ | 3 | 48+ | 3 | 3.24 | 33+ |
| 3 | (United States) Brian Zarzuela | 33+ | 1 | 51+ | 1 | 1.0 | 33 |
| 4 | (United Kingdom) Sebastian Musson | 31 | 2 | 34+ | 6 | 3.46 | 23+ |
| 5 | (Norway) Isak Ripman | 26+ | 5 | 35+ | 5 | 4.47 | – |
| 6 | (France) Anthony Guillen | 21+ | 6 | 35 | 5 | 5.48 | – |
| 7 | (Germany) Markus Crell | 18+ | 7 | 31+ | 8 | 7.48 | – |
| 7 | (United Kingdom) James Rudge | 15+ | 8 | 32 | 7 | 7.48 | – |
| 9 | (France) Camille Brassier | 15 | 9 | 25 | 9 | 9.49 | – |
| 10 | (Denmark) Peter Tramm | 15 | 9 | 22+ | 10 | 10.0 | – |
| 11 | (United States) Matthew Lynch | 15 | 9 | 17+ | 11 | 10.72 | – |
| 12 | (United States) Dylan Retsek | 10+ | 12 | 17+ | 11 | 11.75 | – |

Men's AU3
| Rank | Name | Qualification | | | | | Final |
| Rank | Name | Route 1 | | Route 2 | | Points | Final |
| Rank | Name | Score | Rank | Score | Rank | Points | Final |
|---|---|---|---|---|---|---|---|
| 1 | (Japan) Nobuhiro Yasuraoka | 25+ | 3 | 28 | 5 | 3.87 | 35+ |
| 2 | (Hungary) Bence Kerekes | 3+ | 1 | 45+ | 1 | 1.0 | 32+ |
| 3 | (Israel) Mor Michael Sapir | 26 | 2 | 38+ | 3 | 2.65 | 32+ |
| 4 | (United States) Mason Keough | 24 | 4 | 44+ | 2 | 2.83 | 25+ |
| 5 | (Switzerland) Dominic Geisseler | 23+ | 5 | 38+ | 3 | 4.39 | – |
| 6 | (Germany) Aldrik Bethke | 23+ | 5 | 26+ | 6 | 5.74 | – |
| 7 | (United States) Benen Parlmer | 15+ | 8 | 22+ | 7 | 8.15 | – |
| 8 | (Brazil) Leonardo Vilha De Oliveira Sofka | 16+ | 7 | 16 | 10 | 8.37 | – |
| 9 | (South Korea) Donggi Yeon | 15+ | 8 | 17+ | 8 | 8.99 | – |
| 9 | (Poland) Jan Zaleski | 15+ | 8 | 17+ | 8 | 8.99 | – |
| 11 | (Poland) Bartlomiej Szyszkowski | 15+ | 8 | 13+ | 11 | 10.45 | – |
| 12 | (India) Biman Biswas | 12 | 12 | 13+ | 11 | 11.75 | – |

Men's RP1
| Rank | Name | Qualification | | | | | Final |
| Rank | Name | Route 1 | | Route 2 | | Points | Final |
| Rank | Name | Score | Rank | Score | Rank | Points | Final |
|---|---|---|---|---|---|---|---|
| 1 | (France) Aloïs Pottier | 46+ | 1 | 38+ | 1 | 1.0 | 43+ |
| 2 | (Germany) Korbinian Franck | 41+ | 2 | 32+ | 2 | 2.0 | 41 |
| 3 | (Norway) Kim Rishaug | 40+ | 3 | 22+ | 4 | 3.67 | 38+ |
| 4 | (Japan) Takuya Okada | 29+ | 6 | 22+ | 4 | 5.2 | 36+ |
| 5 | (United Kingdom) Luke Jamieson | 32 | 5 | 12 | 10 | 7.25 | 30+ |
| 6 | (United States) Tim Berruyer Galte | 32+ | 4 | 23+ | 3 | 3.46 | 28+ |
| 7 | (United States) Paul Martin | 29 | 7 | 15 | 7 | 7.5 | – |
| 8 | (Germany) Sebastian Horn | 20 | 10 | 15+ | 6 | 8.12 | – |
| 9 | (Australia) Glen Todd | 29 | 7 | 11+ | 12 | 9.87 | – |
| 10 | (Germany) Tim Schaffrinna | 17 | 13 | 15 | 7 | 10.06 | – |
| 11 | (Romania) Andrei George Petraru | 25+ | 9 | 11+ | 12 | 10.82 | – |
| 12 | (Japan) Takehiko Otani | 16 | 17 | 14_ | 9 | 12.37 | – |
| 13 | (United Kingdom) Laurence Morgan | 16+ | 15 | 12 | 10 | 12.76 | – |
| 14 | (Germany) Sebastian Depke | 20 | 10 | 10+ | 16 | 13.47 | – |
| 14 | (Germany) Mario Persing | 20 | 10 | 10+ | 16 | 13.47 | – |
| 16 | (United States) Joshua Unterman | 16+ | 15 | 11+ | 12 | 14.2 | – |
| 17 | (United States) Connor King | 17 | 13 | 11 | 15 | 14.23 | – |
| 18 | (United States) Ruchir Khaitan | 9+ | 19 | 9 | 18 | 18.49 | – |
| 18 | (China) Yuefei Tian | 12+ | 18 | 6 | 19 | 18.49 | – |

Men's RP2
| Rank | Name | Qualification | | | | | Final |
| Rank | Name | Route 1 | | Route 2 | | Points | Final |
| Rank | Name | Score | Rank | Score | Rank | Points | Final |
|---|---|---|---|---|---|---|---|
| 1 | (United States) Brayden Butler | 43+ | 3 | 33+ | 1 | 1.73 | 44+ |
| 2 | (India) Manikandan Kumar | 48+ | 1 | 27+ | 4 | 2.0 | 36+ |
| 3 | (Germany) Philipp Hrozek | 40 | 4 | 28 | 3 | 3.46 | 36 |
| 4 | (United States) Benjamin Mayforth | 45+ | 2 | 28+ | 2 | 2.0 | 23+ |
| 5 | (United States) Johnny Guintana | 33 | 5 | 23 | 5 | 5.0 | – |
| 6 | (United States) Jeffrey Mellenthin | 20 | 8 | 16 | 6 | 6.93 | – |
| 6 | (South Korea) Sanggeun Yun | 22 | 6 | 10 | 8 | 6.93 | – |
| 8 | (China) Jincheng Zhang | 20+ | 7 | 13+ | 7 | 7.0 | – |

Men's RP3
| Rank | Name | Qualification | | | | | Final |
| Rank | Name | Route 1 | | Route 2 | | Points | Final |
| Rank | Name | Score | Rank | Score | Rank | Points | Final |
|---|---|---|---|---|---|---|---|
| 1 | (Japan) Kazuhiko Yamashita | 39+ | 1 | Top | 1 | 1.0 | 39+ |
| 2 | (Belgium) Camille Caulier | 35+ | 4 | 46+ | 2 | 2.83 | 35+ |
| 3 | (Netherlands) Jamie Barendrecht | 36+ | 3 | 44+ | 4 | 3.46 | 34+ |
| 4 | (Japan) Tadashi Takano | 37 | 2 | 45 | 3 | 2.45 | 32+ |
| 5 | (United Kingdom) Luke Smith | 25+ | 5 | 37+ | 6 | 5.74 | – |
| 6 | (Romania) Andrej Haršány | 23+ | 8 | 38 | 5 | 6.32 | – |
| 7 | (Czech Republic) Frantisek Rys | 25+ | 5 | 29+ | 8 | 6.63 | – |
| 8 | (Brazil) Igor Jean Silva Mesquita | 24 | 7 | 31+ | 7 | 7.0 | – |
| 9 | (Hungary) András Szijártó | 21+ | 9 | 28+ | 9 | 9.0 | – |
| 10 | (Romania) Stefan Liviu Dogaru | 16+ | 10 | 27+ | 10 | 10.5 | – |
| 10 | (Poland) Jakub Szmanda | 16+ | 10 | 27+ | 10 | 10.5 | – |
| 12 | (United States) Mark Jourdian | 15+ | 12 | 17+ | 13 | 12.73 | – |
| 12 | (Norway) Ola Nygard | 15 | 13 | 21+ | 12 | 12.73 | – |
| 14 | (United States) Deva Ramireddy | 15 | 13 | 17+ | 13 | 13.5 | – |

== Women's results ==
Women's B1
| Rank | Name | Qualification | | | | | Final |
| Rank | Name | Route 1 | | Route 2 | | Points | Final |
| Rank | Name | Score | Rank | Score | Rank | Points | Final |
|---|---|---|---|---|---|---|---|
| 1 | (Japan) Hiromi Aoki | 40 | 1 | 45 | 1 | 1.0 | 39+ |
| 2 | (Italy) Nadia Bredice | 27+ | 2 | 34+ | 2 | 2.0 | 37 |
| 3 | (Slovenia) Tanja Glusic | 24+ | 3 | 32+ | 3 | 3.0 | 24+ |
| 4 | (United States) Emeline Lakrout | 22+ | 4 | 29+ | 5 | 4.47 | – |
| 4 | (Romania) Adriana Tofan | 20+ | 5 | 30 | 4 | 4.47 | – |

Women's B2
| Rank | Name | Qualification | | | | | Final |
| Rank | Name | Route 1 | | Route 2 | | Points | Final |
| Rank | Name | Score | Rank | Score | Rank | Points | Final |
|---|---|---|---|---|---|---|---|
| 1 | (United States) Seneida Biendarra | Top | 1 | Top | 1 | 1.0 | 53 |
| 2 | (Austria) Linda Le Bon | 43+ | 2 | 52+ | 2 | 2.0 | 37+ |
| 3 | (Germany) Luisa Grube | 41 | 3 | 51 | 4 | 3.46 | 37+ |
| 4 | (France) Melissa Cesarone | 27 | 4 | 51+ | 3 | 3.46 | 35 |

Women's B3
| Rank | Name | Qualification | | | | | Final |
| Rank | Name | Route 1 | | Route 2 | | Points | Final |
| Rank | Name | Score | Rank | Score | Rank | Points | Final |
|---|---|---|---|---|---|---|---|
| 1 | (United States) Linn Poston | Top | 1 | Top | 1 | 2.45 | Top |
| 2 | (United States) Phoebe Barkan | Top | 1 | Top | 1 | 2.45 | 56 |
| 3 | (France) Elsa Boutel Menard | Top | 1 | Top | 1 | 2.45 | 28+ |
| 4 | (Japan) Mika Maeoka | Top | 1 | 50+ | 4 | 3.46 | 39+ |
| 5 | (Romania) Ionela Dragan | Top | 1 | 47+ | 5 | 3.87 | – |
| 6 | (Japan) Yumi Ejiri | 40+ | 6 | 47 | 6 | 6.0 | – |
| 7 | (United States) Mandi Curtis | 19+ | 7 | 25 | 8 | 7.48 | – |
| 8 | (Poland) Agnieszka Kwolek | 11+ | 9 | 26 | 7 | 7.94 | – |
| 9 | (United States) Paige Trotter | 15 | 8 | 18+ | 9 | 8.49 | – |

Women's AL1
| Rank | Name | Qualification | | | | | Final |
| Rank | Name | Route 1 | | Route 2 | | Points | Final |
| Rank | Name | Score | Rank | Score | Rank | Points | Final |
|---|---|---|---|---|---|---|---|
in AL1

Women's AL2
| Rank | Name | Qualification | | | | | Final |
| Rank | Name | Route 1 | | Route 2 | | Points | Final |
| Rank | Name | Score | Rank | Score | Rank | Points | Final |
|---|---|---|---|---|---|---|---|
| 1 | (France) Lucie Jarrige | 49+ | 1 | 44 | 1 | 1.0 | 40 |
| 2 | (Australia) Sarah Larcombe | 37+ | 2 | 31+ | 2 | 2.0 | 35+ |
| 3 | (United States) Daliya Hansen | 26 | 5 | 19 | 3 | 4.74 | 23 |
| 4 | (Portugal) Tânia Chaves | 27+ | 4 | 19 | 3 | 4.24 | 22 |
| 5 | (Italy) Fiamma Cocchi | 30 | 3 | 14+ | 9 | 5.34 | – |
| 6 | (South Africa) Emily Gray | 23+ | 6 | 19 | 3 | 5.61 | – |
| 7 | (New Zealand) Rachel Maia | 23+ | 6 | 18 | 7 | 7.0 | – |
| 8 | (United States) Morgan Loomis | 20+ | 12 | 19 | 3 | 7.35 | – |
| 9 | (Japan) Masako Watanabe | 23+ | 6 | 15+ | 8 | 7.48 | – |
| 10 | (United States) Kaitlyn Truscott | 22+ | 10 | 14+ | 9 | 9.75 | – |
| 11 | (China) Yan Su | 23 | 9 | 12 | 12 | 10.39 | – |
| 12 | (United States) Hannah McFadden | 21+ | 11 | 14 | 11 | 11.0 | – |

Women's AU2
| Rank | Name | Qualification | | | | | Final |
| Rank | Name | Route 1 | | Route 2 | | Points | Final |
| Rank | Name | Score | Rank | Score | Rank | Points | Final |
|---|---|---|---|---|---|---|---|
| 1 | (France) Solenne Piret | 44 | 1 | 53 | 1 | 1.0 | 47 |
| 2 | (Italy) Lucia Capovilla | 35+ | 2 | 38+ | 2 | 2.0 | 27 |
| 3 | (United States) Eleanor Rubin | 31+ | 3 | 31+ | 3 | 3.24 | 26+ |
| 4 | (France) Siloë Tetaz | 31+ | 3 | 25+ | 4 | 3.74 | 24 |
| 5 | (United States) Isabel Benvenuti | 16+ | 6 | 25 | 5 | 5.7 | – |
| 6 | (United Kingdom) Isabella Walsh | 19+ | 5 | 14+ | 6 | 6.12 | – |
| 7 | (United States) Corinna Wimmer | 16+ | 6 | 14 | 10 | 8.26 | – |
| 8 | (United States) Josephine Fouts | 16 | 8 | 14+ | 6 | 8.44 | – |
| 8 | (Spain) Ana María Gómez Escobar | 16 | 8 | 14+ | 6 | 8.44 | – |
| 8 | (Germany) Carolin Heberle | 16 | 8 | 14+ | 6 | 8.44 | – |
| 11 | (Spain) María Cabezas Ramos | 16 | 8 | 14 | 10 | 9.99 | – |
| 12 | (China) Xie Ting | 11+ | 12 | 11+ | 12 | 12.0 | – |
| 13 | (United States) Elise Morley | 10 | 13 | 3 | 13 | 13.0 | – |

Women's AU3
| Rank | Name | Qualification | | | | | Final |
| Rank | Name | Route 1 | | Route 2 | | Points | Final |
| Rank | Name | Score | Rank | Score | Rank | Points | Final |
|---|---|---|---|---|---|---|---|
| 1 | (Germany) Rosalie Schaupert | 35+ | 1 | 31+ | 1 | 1.0 | 40 |
| 2 | (Slovenia) Manca Smrekar | 32 | 2 | 30+ | 2 | 2.0 | 28 |
| 3 | (France) Oriane Ilpide | 31+ | 3 | 28+ | 3 | 3.24 | 22+ |
| 4 | (Spain) Paula De La Calle Pizarro | 31+ | 3 | 27 | 4 | 3.74 | – |
| 5 | (Germany) Ria Grindel | 19 | 5 | 14+ | 5 | 5.0 | – |

Women's RP1
| Rank | Name | Qualification | | | | | Final |
| Rank | Name | Route 1 | | Route 2 | | Points | Final |
| Rank | Name | Score | Rank | Score | Rank | Points | Final |
|---|---|---|---|---|---|---|---|
| 1 | (United States) Melissa Ruiz | 40 | 1 | 19+ | 1 | 1.0 | 34 |
| 2 | (Netherlands) Eva Mol | 32+ | 2 | 17+ | 2 | 2.0 | 31+ |
| 3 | (United States) Hannah Zook | 30+ | 3 | 9+ | 6 | 4.24 | 30+ |
| 4 | (Switzerland) Doris Rohner | 17 | 6 | 14+ | 3 | 4.24 | 24 |
| 5 | (United States) Jackie Stewart | 29 | 4 | 11+ | 4 | 4.24 | 22+ |
| 6 | (United Kingdom) Lucy Keyworth | 24+ | 5 | 11+ | 4 | 4.74 | – |
| 7 | (United States) Tiffany Yu | 7+ | 7 | 5+ | 7 | 7.0 | – |

Women's RP2
| Rank | Name | Qualification | | | | | Final |
| Rank | Name | Route 1 | | Route 2 | | Points | Final |
| Rank | Name | Score | Rank | Score | Rank | Points | Final |
|---|---|---|---|---|---|---|---|
| 1 | (United States) Emily Seelenfreund | 25+ | 4 | 34+ | 2 | 3.16 | 25+ |
| 2 | (Austria) Jasmin Plank | Top | 1 | 50+ | 1 | 1.0 | 23+ |
| 3 | (Japan) Matoi Futahashi | 28+ | 3 | 33+ | 4 | 3.67 | 22 |
| 4 | (United States) Megan Gleason | 32 | 2 | 31 | 7 | 3.74 | 15 |
| 5 | (Italy) Chiara Cavina | 22+ | 6 | 34+ | 2 | 4.03 | – |
| 6 | (Norway) Dina Eivik | 22+ | 6 | 33+ | 4 | 5.41 | – |
| 7 | (Switzerland) Sarah Longhi | 25 | 5 | 32 | 6 | 5.48 | – |
| 8 | (Germany) Nicole Diehl | 16 | 8 | 16+ | 8 | 8.0 | – |

Women's RP3
| Rank | Name | Qualification | | | | | Final |
| Rank | Name | Route 1 | | Route 2 | | Points | Final |
| Rank | Name | Score | Rank | Score | Rank | Points | Final |
|---|---|---|---|---|---|---|---|
| 1 | (Brazil) Marina Dias | 35 | 2 | 51 | 4 | 2.83 | 45 |
| 2 | (United States) Nat Vorel | 37+ | 1 | Top | 1 | 1.22 | 41 |
| 3 | (Japan) Momoko Yoshida | 31+ | 3 | Top | 1 | 2.29 | 38+ |
| 4 | (Germany) Lena Schoellig | 23+ | 5 | 51+ | 3 | 3.87 | 36 |
| 5 | (Germany) Laura Nesciobelli | 31+ | 3 | 50+ | 5 | 4.18 | – |
| 6 | (Poland) Jadwiga Gąsienica-Chmiel | 19+ | 7 | 47 | 6 | 6.48 | – |
| 6 | (United States) Lindsay Purcell | 23 | 6 | 41 | 7 | 6.48 | – |
| 8 | (Poland) Anna Lipinska | 5 | 8 | 14 | 8 | 8.0 | – |
