= Salesian College, Farnborough =

Coordinates: 51.280°N 0.743°W

Salesian College
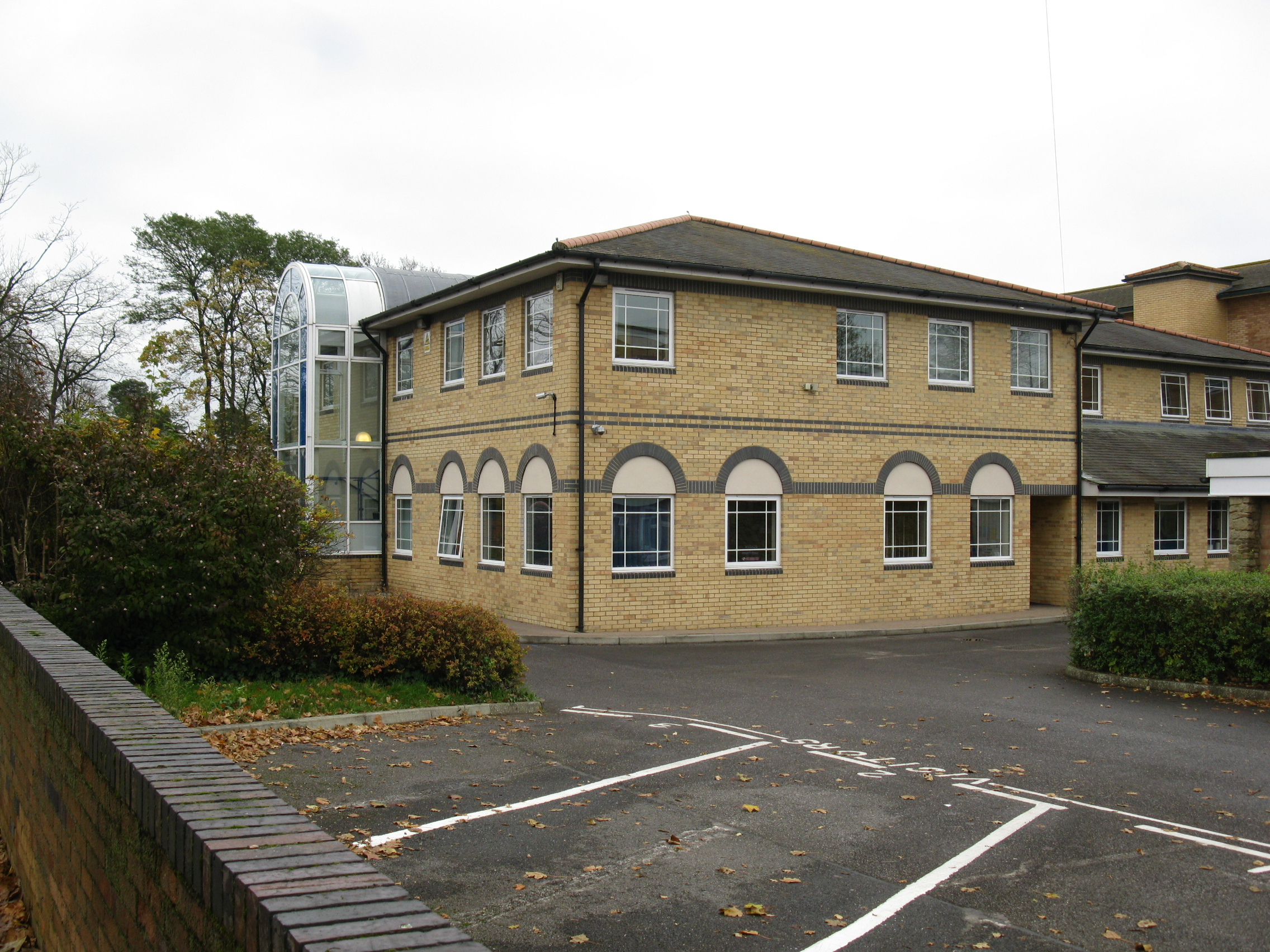
- School badge Salesian College in 2012
- Farnborough, Hampshire, GU14 6PA; England

Information
- Type: Private day school
- Motto: Virtus Sola Nobilitas (Latin: "Virtue is the only nobility")
- Religious affiliation: Roman Catholic (Salesian)
- Established: 1901
- Department for Education URN: 116543 Tables
- Headmaster: Gerard Owens
- Gender: Boys; Coeducational (Sixth Form)
- Age: 11 to 18
- Enrolment: 634
- Colour
- Patron Saint: St John Bosco
- Website: http://www.salesiancollege.com

Salesian College is an independent Roman Catholic school in Farnborough, Hampshire, England. Founded in 1901 as a small preparatory school for boys, it soon expanded to provide secondary education owing to its increasing popularity. In November 2022, the school had a total of 634 pupils enrolled, 129 in the Sixth Form. For the 2007–08 academic year, the College announced that it would admit girls into the Sixth Form for the first time.

== History ==
=== Establishment ===
In 1901, Bishop Cahill of the Diocese of Portsmouth invited the Salesians of Battersea to take over the orphanage, a former tin factory, in Queen's Road, Farnborough. This marked the beginning of the Salesians' work in education in the local area and as a parish. By 1902 a reporter in Sheldrakes Military Gazette noted that the thirty 'poor Catholic waifs and those sons of sore stricken Roman Catholic parents' had a home 'comfortable in every respect', and were learning trades.

The numbers of boys attending the school increased as a result of boarding requirements becoming heavier. As a result, a new dormitory was constructed along with a small refectory and some additional classrooms. Prior to World War I, the new wing and tower was completed which consisted of the dormitories and toilets on the upper floor, and the staff refectory and modern kitchen facilities located on the lower floor, were created.

=== Structural growth ===
Under previous Headmaster, Mr Wilson, the College witnessed substantial structural growth, the most significant being the erection of the Sean Devereux Sixth Form Centre providing facilities for girls, and new classrooms built equipped with improved technology. During the Great War, 58 former Salesian College pupils were killed, whilst others who took part were awarded decorations for their efforts during the Great War. In 1916, the area which is now the school playground was acquired, and the school playing fields located on Park Road were purchased to be used in the War effort for the "Grow More Food campaign".

In 1956, work began on the construction of the Blackburn Building. It provided facilities for ten new classrooms, a new hall, gymnasium, as well as changing rooms. By 1963, new laboratories and a lecture hall were constructed alongside the new school. The school became an independent grammar school in 1966, and by 1970, the preparatory school was discontinued which saw the departure three years later of the Salesian Sisters. In 1979, Salesian College had no boarders attending the school, something which had never occurred in the school's history until that point. As a result, this led the school to becoming a provision for day pupils only.

=== Recent history ===
Further expansion works continued, and in 1997, the Delmer building was completed, providing the school with new ICT facilities, art rooms, staffroom, a Technology Suite, general teaching classrooms as well as new office accommodation. In 1998, the Sean Devereux Sixth Form centre was fully refurbished as well as extended in terms of size and accommodation. The original College building at Sherbourne Road was demolished in 1999.

The College maintains links with the nearby Alton Convent School and organises joint activities and events together, such as the yearly Lower Sixth trip to Tregoyd and the Senior College Prom. The most recent addition to the college is the renovation of the old music school. The process began during the 2012–2013 academic year and the new Father Brendan McGuinness Music Building was completed and officially opened in September 2013. It is named in honour of the college's former chaplain.

== Curriculum ==
In the Lower School of the school, between Years 7-9, boys follow a core curriculum consisting of a total of 16 subjects. In the Upper School, between Years 10–11, boys study a total of 10+ subjects to GCSE which include core and option choice subjects. In the Sixth Form, between Years 12–13, all students are required to study 4 subjects in Year 12, with the majority of subjects reducing to 3 subjects in Year 13. An Extended Project Qualification is available for pupils who are in Year 13.

The school provides curriculum teaching in the core subjects of English, Mathematics and Religious Studies, with boys in Years 7–9 studying Art, Classics, Computing, Drama, French, Geography, History, Music and Spanish. Co-ordinated Sciences are taught from Year 7, then boys go onto study either Biology, Physics or Chemistry as separate entity subjects from Year 9 onwards. Additionally, boys in Years 7-9 have one timetabled period of Physical Education, and two periods of Games, each week.

From Year 10 onwards, boys are required to study the subjects of Maths, English, Religious Studies and either Combined (Double) Sciences or Triple Science, plus an additional selection of optional subjects as they prepare to undertake their GCSE examinations.

The school's Year 7 Junior Drama Club works towards the annual Performing Arts Evening during the school's Autumn Term. Year 8 boys also participate in an LAMDA examination, which upon completion, gives them a qualification in devising, with the final examination being performed in front of an external examiner. By Year 9, boys are prepared for Key Stage 4 with a GCSE Foundation Drama Club, which aims to expand on the learning of "more able and keen actors".

== Academic performance and inspections ==
In 2023, the school attained 'excellent' A level results, with a 100% pass rate, an accolade the school has held for the eighth consecutive year, with 87% of grades awarded in the A*-C range in GCSE examinations.

The school's 2023 GCSE results saw 97.2% of boys having achieved at least ten grades 9-4 each, including in the core curriculum subjects of English and Maths. 87% of all grades across the school were 5-9, and 70% of all grades were 6-9. 49 GCSEs were graded below 4 (fail grade).

== Notable former pupils ==
- Steve Backshall, naturalist, writer and television presenter
- Daniel Boys, musical theatre actor
- Sean Devereux, a Salesian missionary and aid-worker assassinated in Kismayu, Somalia in 1993 while working for UNICEF. There is a stained-glass window to commemorate Devereux's life and work in the College Chapel.
- Jeremy Metcalfe, racing driver
- Matthew Phillips, World Champion Paraclimber
- Alastair Stewart, journalist and presenter
- Phil Taylor, England international rugby player
- Harvey Dixon, middle-distance runner
- George D. W. Smith, materials scientist at University of Oxford

=== Old Salesians Association ===
The Farnborough Old Salesians Association (OSA) is a society for former pupils who wish to contact other Old Boys. It has its foundations in the 1920s, with its first formal meeting held in 1927. The association has organised whole-year reunions.

For those Old Boys who live locally, the OSA organises activities throughout the year. The OSA regularly assists the Salesian family in various local undertaking and around the world by activity or financial aid. The OSA maintains links with the wider Salesian family by means of the Salesian Past Pupils UK and Ex Allievi di Don Bosco.

In the 1970s the OSA donated a marble tablet in commemoration of the Old Boys who gave their lives in the Second World War. The tablet shows the OSA (at that time the Salesian Old Boys Association Farnborough) badge and the motto "Salesian Old Boys Let not the glory fade away Keep bright the flame of memory and honour them 1939–1945."

== Headmasters ==
1983–1997: Br Michael Delmer
1997–2014: Patrick A. Wilson
2014–present: Gerard Owens

== See also ==
- Bishopric of the Forces
- Cathedral of St Michael and St George, Aldershot
- Dominic Savio
- John Bosco
- Francis de Sales
- Patronage of the Blessed Virgin Mary
- Roman Catholic Diocese of Portsmouth
- Salesians of Don Bosco
