= John Sharp (actor) =

British actor (1920–1992)

- John Sharp, playing Percy Spendilow in the series The Onedin Line.
- Born: John Herbert Sharp; 5 August 1920; Bradford, West Riding of Yorkshire, England, UK
- Died: 26 November 1992 (aged 72); London, England, UK
- Occupation: actor
- Years active: 1949–1991

John Herbert Sharp (5 August 1920 – 26 November 1992) was a British actor who made numerous appearances on television during a career spanning 42 years.

== Biography ==
Sharp made more than 130 appearances in television and occasionally films between 1949 and 1991. Although active in theatre, Sharp began as a film actor in 1949 and appeared in films throughout the 1950s. By the mid-1960s he mostly appeared in British television on popular shows of the era such as The Avengers in the 1967 "Murdersville" episode as the publican, the Randall and Hopkirk (Deceased) episode "The Ghost Who Saved the Bank at Monte Carlo"; The Prisoner, Not On Your Nellie opposite Hylda Baker, Z-Cars, and in 1976 in The Sweeney episode "On the Run" in which he played Uncle, a homosexual retired Magistrate who becomes embroiled in the escape of a psychopathic prisoner having befriended the prisoner's former accomplice. He performed in Charles Dickens TV adaptations in the 1980s. In 1991, he made his last television appearance in the programme Lovejoy. He played the role of the "apparently cynical" Uncle Will in Luigi Comencini's 1966 Incompreso.

Sharp's most notable television appearances in a recurring role was on the All Creatures Great and Small television series, in which he portrayed Ezra Biggins, an aged, parsimonious and awkward Yorkshire dairy farmer. "John Sharp was just like you see him," recalled Peter Davison, who played Tristan Farnon in the series. "He was a wonderful raconteur and would tell you these long stories." Christopher Timothy, who played the leading role of James Herriot, added: "I found myself getting quite moved when I watched an episode recently, not because of what we were doing, but because all those lovely people are no longer with us. John Sharp was a lovely, lovely man."

== Selected filmography ==
- Dr. Morelle: The Case of the Missing Heiress (1949)
- Celia (1949) – Mr. Haldane
- Diamond City (1949) – Reader (uncredited)
- Your Witness (1950) – Police Constable Hawkins
- Night and the City (1950) – Man (uncredited)
- A Case for PC 49 (1951) – Desk Sergeant
- Angels One Five (1952) – 'Soss'
- The House Across the Lake (1954) – Mr. Hardcastle
- Child's Play (1954) – Police Sgt. Butler
- Left Right and Centre (1959) – Mr. Reeves
- No Love for Johnnie (1961) – Railway Station Master (uncredited)
- The Golden Rabbit (1962) – Peebles
- Stork Talk (1962) – Papa Pierre
- A Jolly Bad Fellow (1964) – Hodges
- Bunny Lake Is Missing (1965) – Finger Print Man
- Take a Pair of Private Eyes (1966) – Crozier
- Misunderstood (1967) – Uncle William 'Will'
- Three Bites of the Apple (1967) – Joe Batterfly
- The White Bus (1967) – Macebearer
- The Prisoner (1968) – Number 2 (A Change of Mind)
- Mrs. Brown, You've Got a Lovely Daughter (1968) – Oakshot
- Spring and Port Wine (1970) – Bowler 4
- Brother Sun, Sister Moon (1972) – Bishop Guido
- That's Your Funeral (1972) – Mayor
- Shabby Tiger (1973) Piggy White (5 episodes)
- And Now the Screaming Starts! (1973) – Henry's friend
- The Wicker Man (1973) – Doctor Ewan
- Watch Out, We're Mad (1974) – The Boss
- Galileo (1975) – Monk Official
- Barry Lyndon (1975) – Doolan
- Robin's Nest (1976) – Butcher
- Jabberwocky (1977) – Sergeant at Gate
- Velvet Hands (1979) – Benny
- The Quiz Kid (1979) – Stanwell
- The Fiendish Plot of Dr. Fu Manchu (1980) – Sir Nules Thudd
- The Bunker (1981) – Dr. Morell
- The Return of the Soldier (1982) – Pearson
- The Dresser (1983) – Mr. Bottomley
- Top Secret! (1984) – Maitre D'
- A Christmas Carol (1984) – Tipton
- The Bride (1985) – Bailiff
- That Summer of White Roses (1989) – Gradonacelnik / The Mayor
- Lovejoy
