= 2023 IFSC Paraclimbing World Championships =

Biennial competition climbing event

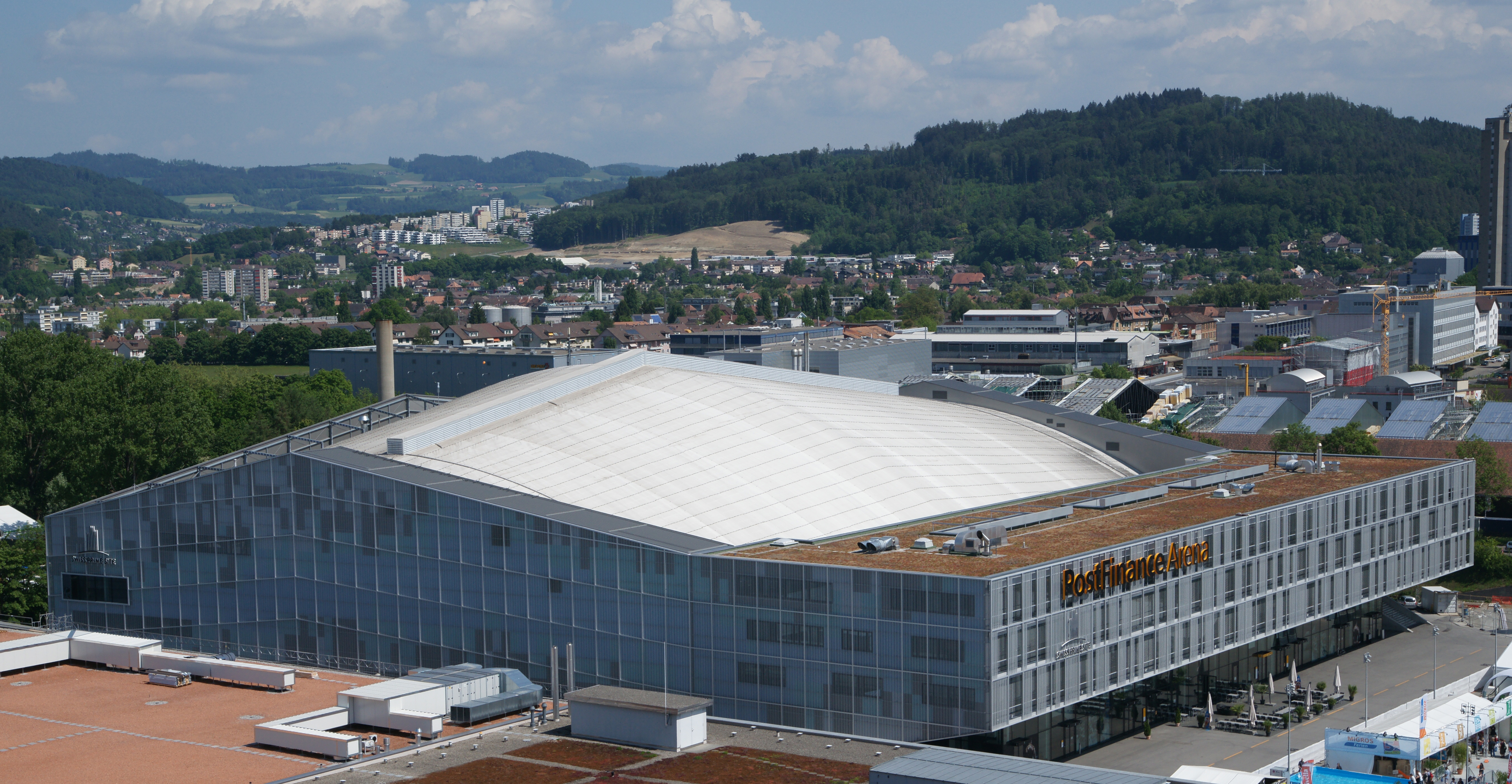
- PostFinance Arena in Bern, Switzerland
- Venue: PostFinance Arena
- Location: Bern, Switzerland
- Date: 7 – 10 August 2023
- Website: https://bern2023.org/

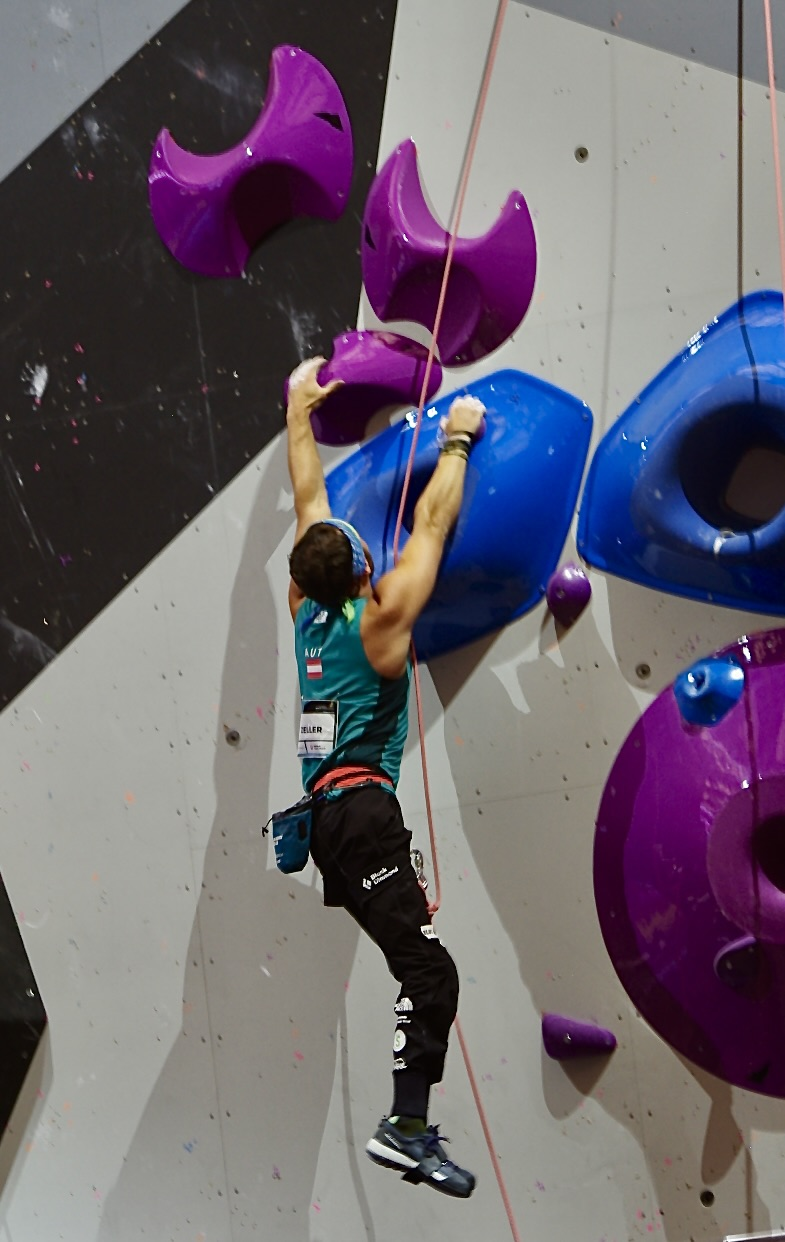
Angelino Zeller shortly before winning the AL1 finals.

The 2023 IFSC Paraclimbing World Championships was the 8th edition of its kind of the leading biennial global championships in competition climbing for athletes with a disability or impairment.

The event was held at the PostFinance Arena in Bern, Switzerland from 7 to 10 September 2023, alongside the 2023 IFSC Climbing World Championships. It included a total of 17 lead events for the respective athlete's impairment classification. Featuring 203 athletes, the event was the largest paraclimbing competition to date, and the first world championship with monetary prizes.

== Medal table ==
* Host nation (Switzerland)

| Rank | Nation | Gold | Silver | Bronze | Total |
|---|---|---|---|---|---|
| 1 | France | 4 | 0 | 0 | 4 |
| 2 | Japan | 3 | 3 | 2 | 8 |
| 3 | Norway | 2 | 0 | 0 | 2 |
| 4 | Austria | 1 | 2 | 1 | 4 |
| 5 | Spain | 1 | 1 | 3 | 5 |
| 6 | Great Britain | 1 | 1 | 2 | 4 |
| 7 | India | 1 | 0 | 1 | 2 |
| 7 | Romania | 1 | 0 | 1 | 2 |
| 9 | Belgium | 1 | 0 | 0 | 1 |
| 9 | Brazil | 1 | 0 | 0 | 1 |
| 9 | Israel | 1 | 0 | 0 | 1 |
| 12 | United States | 0 | 5 | 4 | 9 |
| 13 | Netherlands | 0 | 2 | 0 | 2 |
| 14 | Australia | 0 | 1 | 0 | 1 |
| 14 | Germany | 0 | 1 | 0 | 1 |
| 14 | Italy | 0 | 1 | 0 | 1 |
| 17 | New Zealand | 0 | 0 | 1 | 1 |
| 17 | Slovakia | 0 | 0 | 1 | 1 |
| 17 | Switzerland* | 0 | 0 | 1 | 1 |
| Totals (19 entries) | | 17 | 17 | 17 | 51 |

== Medal summary ==
The medals were awarded as follows:

| Event | Gold | Silver | Bronze |
|---|---|---|---|
| Men's B1 | (Japan) Sho Aita | (Spain) Francisco Javier Aguilar Amoedo | (Romania) Răzvan Nedu |
| Men's B2 | (Japan) Fumiya Hamanoue | (United Kingdom) Richard Slocock | (Spain) Guillermo Pelegrín Gómez |
| Men's B3 | (Romania) Cosmin Florin Candoi | (Japan) Kazuhiro Minowada | (United Kingdom) Lux Losey Sail |
| Men's AL1 | (Austria) Angelino Zeller | (Austria) Markus Pösendorfer | (United States) Tanner Cislaw |
| Men's AL2 | (France) Thierry Delarue | (United States) Ethan Zilz | (Spain) Albert Guardia Ferrer |
| Men's AU2 | (Norway) Isak Ripman | (Germany) Kevin Bartke | (United States) Brian Zarzuela |
| Men's AU3 | (Israel) Mor Michael Sapir | (Japan) Nobuhiro Yusaraoka | (Switzerland) Dominic Geisseler |
| Men's RP1 | (France) Aloïs Pottier | (United States) Elliott Nguyen | (Japan) Takuya Okada |
| Men's RP2 | (Israel) Mor Michael Sapir | (United States) Benjamin Mayforth | (France) Bastien Thomas |
| Men's RP3 | (Spain) Iván Muñoz Escolar | (United States) Benjamin Mayforth | (India) Manikandan Kumar |
| Women's B1 | in B2 | | |
| Women's B2 | (United Kingdom) Abigail Robinson | (United States) Seneida Biendarra | (Austria) Edith Scheinecker |
| Women's B3 | (India) Sunita Dhondappanavar | (Japan) Mika Maeoka | (Japan) Yumi Ejiri |
| Women's AL1 | in RP1 | | |
| Women's AL2 | (France) Lucie Jarrige | (Australia) Sarah Larcombe | (Australia) Rachel Maia |
| Women's AU2 | (France) Solenne Piret | (Italy) Lucia Capovilla | (United States) Maureen Beck |
| Women's AU3 | in RP3 | | |
| Women's RP1 | (Belgium) Pavitra Vandenhoven | (United States) Melissa Ruiz | (Spain) Marta Peche Salinero |
| Women's RP2 | (Norway) Dina Eivik | (Austria) Jasmin Plank | (United States) Anna Devries |
| Women's RP3 | (Brazil) Marina Dias | (Netherlands) Christiane Luttikhuizen | (United Kingdom) Martha Evans |

== Men's results ==
Men's B1
| Rank | Name | Qualification | | | | | Final |
| Rank | Name | Route 1 | | Route 2 | | Points | Final |
| Rank | Name | Score | Rank | Score | Rank | Points | Final |
|---|---|---|---|---|---|---|---|
| 1 | (Japan) Sho Aita | Top | 1 | 37+ | 3 | 2.12 | 42+ |
| 2 | (Spain) Francisco Javier Aguilar Amoedo | Top | 1 | 39 | 1 | 1.5 | 35 |
| 3 | (Romania) Razvan Nedu | 42 | 3 | 39 | 1 | 2.12 | 31+ |
| 4 | (United Kingdom) Jesse Dufton | 39 | 4 | 29 | 4 | 4.0 | 21+ |
| 5 | (Switzerland) Roland Paillex | 28 | 5 | 22 | 5 | 5.24 | – |
| 6 | (Romania) Alexandru Benchea | 28 | 5 | 21+ | 6 | 5.74 | – |
| 7 | (United States) Bill Casson | 13+ | 7 | 14 | 7 | 7.0 | – |

Men's B2
| Rank | Name | Qualification | | | | | Final |
| Rank | Name | Route 1 | | Route 2 | | Points | Final |
| Rank | Name | Score | Rank | Score | Rank | Points | Final |
|---|---|---|---|---|---|---|---|
| 1 | (Japan) Fumiya Hamanoue | 41 | 1 | Top | 1 | 1.0 | 36 |
| 2 | (United Kingdom) Richard Slocock | 29 | 2 | 41+ | 4 | 3.46 | 23+ |
| 3 | (Spain) Guillermo Pelegrín Gómez | 29 | 2 | 42 | 3 | 3.0 | 35+ |
| 4 | (Spain) Raul Simon Franco | 27 | 5 | 42+ | 2 | 3.16 | 24 |
| 5 | (Italy) Simone Salvagnin | 29 | 2 | 39 | 5 | 3.87 | – |
| 6 | (United States) Kevin Chao | 14 | 6 | 13 | 7 | 6.48 | – |
| 6 | (Germany) Christoph Pohlmann | – | – | 13+ | 6 | 6.48 | – |

Men's B3
| Rank | Name | Qualification | | | | | Final |
| Rank | Name | Route 1 | | Route 2 | | Points | Final |
| Rank | Name | Score | Rank | Score | Rank | Points | Final |
|---|---|---|---|---|---|---|---|
| 1 | (Romania) Cosmin Florin Candoi | Top | 1 | Top | 1 | 1.22 | Top |
| 2 | (Japan) Kazuhiro Minowada | 39 | 3 | Top | 1 | 2.12 | Top |
| 3 | (United Kingdom) Lux Losey Sail | 39+ | 2 | 50 | 3 | 2.45 | 42+ |
| 4 | (Romania) Daniel-bebe-vasilică Andrei | 33+ | 4 | 41 | 5 | 4.47 | 38+ |
| 5 | (Canada) Chaz Misuraca | 31+ | 5 | 42+ | 4 | 4.47 | 28+ |
| 6 | (Japan) Motohiro Ejiri | 27+ | 6 | 35 | 7 | 6.48 | – |
| 6 | (Germany) Sebastian Schmitz | 26+ | 7 | 39+ | 6 | 6.48 | – |
| 8 | (United States) Connor Gearey | 19 | 8 | 19+ | 8 | 8.0 | – |

Men's AL1
| Rank | Name | Qualification | | | | | Final |
| Rank | Name | Route 1 | | Route 2 | | Points | Final |
| Rank | Name | Score | Rank | Score | Rank | Points | Final |
|---|---|---|---|---|---|---|---|
| 1 | (Austria) Angelino Zeller | 33+ | 1 | 49 | 1 | 1.22 | 51+ |
| 2 | (Austria) Markus Pösendorfer | 33+ | 1 | 43 | 2 | 1.73 | 39+ |
| 3 | (United States) Tanner Cislaw | 25+ | 3 | 30+ | 3 | 3.0 | 28 |
| 4 | (Austria) Daniel Kontsch | 20+ | 4 | 25+ | 4 | 4.0 | 28 |
| 5 | (Japan) Ryota Hirai | 14+ | 5 | 14+ | 7 | 5.92 | – |
| 6 | (Switzerland) Sulivan Thuer | 14 | 6 | 15+ | 6 | 6.0 | – |
| 7 | (Japan) Naohisa Hatakeyama | 9+ | 7 | 22+ | 5 | 6.12 | – |
| 8 | (United States) Carlos Quiles | 9+ | 7 | 11+ | 8 | 7.98 | – |
| 9 | (United States) Jorge Macias | 8 | 9 | 11+ | 8 | 8.75 | – |

Men's AL2
| Rank | Name | Qualification | | | | | Final |
| Rank | Name | Route 1 | | Route 2 | | Points | Final |
| Rank | Name | Score | Rank | Score | Rank | Points | Final |
|---|---|---|---|---|---|---|---|
| 1 | (France) Thierry Delarue | 43 | 1 | 29+ | 1 | 1.0 | Top |
| 2 | (United States) Ethan Zilz | 39 | 3 | 24 | 7 | 4.95 | 51+ |
| 3 | (Spain) Albert Guardia Ferrer | 41+ | 2 | 27+ | 2 | 2.45 | 51 |
| 4 | (Spain) Urko Carmona Barandiaran | 33+ | 5 | 25+ | 5 | 5.24 | 49+ |
| 5 | (Belgium) Frederik Leys | 39 | 3 | 27+ | 2 | 3.24 | 36+ |
| 6 | (Japan) Shuhei Yuki | 33 | 7 | 27+ | 2 | 4.74 | 36+ |
| 7 | (France) Julien Gasc | 33+ | 5 | 23 | 9 | 7.04 | – |
| 8 | (United States) Corey Ramos | 32 | 9 | 25 | 6 | 7.75 | – |
| 9 | (United States) Gavin Nix | 32 | 9 | 23+ | 8 | 8.94 | – |
| 10 | (Norway) Sebastian Menze | 33 | 7 | 19 | 12 | 9.68 | – |
| 11 | (United Kingdom) Martin Heald | 31+ | 12 | 19+ | 11 | 11.49 | – |
| 12 | (Italy) David Kammerer | 32 | 9 | 18 | 14 | 11.83 | – |
| 13 | (Germany) Nicholas Perreth | 17+ | 15 | 20+ | 10 | 12.25 | – |
| 14 | (Switzerland) Martin Villiger | 28+ | 13 | 19 | 12 | 12.99 | – |
| 15 | (United Kingdom) Stuart Sneddon | 28+ | 13 | 17+ | 15 | 14.23 | – |
| 16 | (Brazil) Luciano Frazão Da Silva | 15+ | 17 | 15+ | 16 | 16.73 | – |
| 17 | (United Kingdom) Jonathan Shields | 16+ | 16 | 8+ | 18 | 16.97 | – |
| 18 | (Switzerland) Christoph Zundel | 15+ | 17 | 11+ | 17 | 17.25 | – |

Men's AU2
| Rank | Name | Qualification | | | | | Final |
| Rank | Name | Route 1 | | Route 2 | | Points | Final |
| Rank | Name | Score | Rank | Score | Rank | Points | Final |
|---|---|---|---|---|---|---|---|
| 1 | (Norway) Isak Ripman | 36 | 3 | Top | 1 | 2.45 | 37+ |
| 2 | (Germany) Kevin Bartke | 40 | 1 | Top | 1 | 1.41 | 36+ |
| 3 | (United States) Brian Zarzuela | 37+ | 2 | Top | 1 | 2.0 | 31+ |
| 4 | (United Kingdom) Sebastian Musson | 21 | 4 | 38+ | 4 | 4.24 | 22 |
| 5 | (United Kingdom) James Rudge | 13+ | 6 | 25+ | 5 | 5.48 | – |
| 6 | (Switzerland) Marco Galli | 21 | 4 | 19 | 7 | 5.61 | – |
| 7 | (United States) Matthew Lynch | 13 | 7 | 19+ | 6 | 6.71 | – |
| 8 | (Denmark) Peter Tramm | 13 | 7 | 15+ | 8 | 7.75 | – |

Men's AU3
| Rank | Name | Qualification | | | | | Final |
| Rank | Name | Route 1 | | Route 2 | | Points | Final |
| Rank | Name | Score | Rank | Score | Rank | Points | Final |
|---|---|---|---|---|---|---|---|
| 1 | (Israel) Mor Michael Sapir | 22+ | 3 | 21+ | 1 | 2.0 | 43 |
| 2 | (Japan) Nobuhiro Yasuraoka | 33 | 1 | 21 | 2 | 1.41 | 42+ |
| 3 | (Switzerland) Geisseler Dominic | 22+ | 3 | 19+ | 3 | 3.46 | 29 |
| 4 | (Chile) Ignacio Martinez | 28+ | 2 | 17+ | 4 | 3.16 | 23 |
| 5 | (France) Erwan Lievin | 22+ | 3 | 17+ | 4 | 4.47 | – |
| 6 | (France) Maxime Meyer | 21+ | 6 | 17+ | 4 | 5.48 | – |
| 7 | (Spain) Eric Liu Lin | 20+ | 7 | 13+ | 7 | 7.25 | – |
| 8 | (United States) Benen Parlmer | 17+ | 8 | 13+ | 7 | 7.98 | – |
| 9 | (Canada) Shamus Boulianne | 17+ | 8 | 11+ | 9 | 8.75 | – |
| 10 | (United Kingdom) Matthew Styles-west | 16+ | 10 | 11 | 10 | 10.0 | – |
| 11 | (Brazil) Leonardo Vilha De Oliveira Sofka | 15+ | 11 | 10 | 11 | 11.0 | – |
| 12 | (India) Biman Biswas | 1+ | 12 | 6+ | 12 | 12.0 | – |

Men's RP1
| Rank | Name | Qualification | | | | | Final |
| Rank | Name | Route 1 | | Route 2 | | Points | Final |
| Rank | Name | Score | Rank | Score | Rank | Points | Final |
|---|---|---|---|---|---|---|---|
| 1 | (France) Aloïs Pottier | Top | 1 | 43+ | 1 | 1.0 | 50 |
| 2 | (United States) Elliott Nguyen | 33 | 2 | 25+ | 2 | 2.45 | 28 |
| 3 | (Japan) Takuya Okada | 28 | 6 | 25+ | 2 | 4.42 | 23+ |
| 4 | (Germany) Sebastian Depke | 23+ | 12 | 25+ | 2 | 6.0 | 23 |
| 5 | (United States) Sunny Yang | 30 | 3 | 24 | 5 | 3.87 | 16 |
| 6 | (United States) Alexander Dornbusch | 29 | 4 | 18+ | 6 | 4.9 | 12+ |
| 7 | (Germany) Tim Schaffrinna | 28+ | 5 | 16+ | 8 | 6.52 | – |
| 8 | (Germany) Mario Persing | 19+ | 15 | 17+ | 7 | 10.42 | – |
| 9 | (Italy) Gian Matteo Ramini | 26 | 9 | 15+ | 11 | 10.45 | – |
| 10 | (Japan) Takehiko Otani | 28 | 6 | 9+ | 18 | 10.97 | – |
| 11 | (United Kingdom) Luke Jamieson | 24+ | 11 | 15+ | 11 | 11.25 | – |
| 12 | (United Kingdom) Laurence Morgan | 26+ | 8 | 12+ | 16 | 11.31 | – |
| 13 | (Switzerland) NikoCan Galbusera | 19+ | 15 | 16+ | 8 | 11.48 | – |
| 14 | (Germany) Sebastian Horn | 26 | 9 | 14 | 14 | 11.53 | – |
| 15 | (United States) Connor King | 21+ | 13 | 14+ | 13 | 13.0 | – |
| 16 | (Spain) Eloi Vila Cullerés | 7+ | 19 | 16 | 10 | 13.78 | – |
| 17 | (Switzerland) Bruno Aerni | 20 | 14 | 13 | 15 | 14.49 | – |
| 18 | (United Kingdom) Alex Downes | 10 | 18 | 11 | 17 | 17.49 | – |
| 19 | (Germany) Marcel Richter | 14+ | 17 | 5+ | 20 | 18.44 | – |
| 20 | (United States) Brian Liebenow | 6 | 20 | 9+ | 18 | 19.24 | – |

Men's RP2
| Rank | Name | Qualification | | | | | Final |
| Rank | Name | Route 1 | | Route 2 | | Points | Final |
| Rank | Name | Score | Rank | Score | Rank | Points | Final |
|---|---|---|---|---|---|---|---|
| 1 | (Spain) Iván Muñoz Escolar | 37+ | 1 | Top | 1 | 1.0 | 43 |
| 2 | (United States) Benjamin Mayforth | 29 | 4 | 49+ | 3 | 3.46 | 38 |
| 3 | (India) Manikandan Kumar | 21+ | 6 | 50+ | 2 | 3.46 | 35+ |
| 4 | (Germany) Philipp Hrozek | 29+ | 2 | 45 | 4 | 3.16 | 22+ |
| 5 | (United States) Brayden Butler | 29+ | 2 | 44 | 5 | 3.54 | – |
| 6 | (Spain) Anther Frigola Gómez | 28+ | 5 | 39+ | 6 | 5.7 | – |
| 7 | (United Kingdom) Kenneth Ellacott | 19+ | 7 | 28+ | 8 | 7.48 | – |
| 8 | (Slovenia) Matej Arh | 17+ | 9 | 39+ | 6 | 7.86 | – |
| 9 | (Germany) Nils Helsper | 18 | 8 | 25 | 9 | 8.49 | – |
| 10 | (Germany) Florian Singer | 17+ | 9 | 22+ | 10 | 9.75 | – |
| 11 | (Switzerland) Hermann Mönch | 14 | 11 | 19 | 11 | 11.0 | – |
| 12 | (Australia) Michael Tarulli | 4+ | 12 | 8+ | 12 | 12.0 | – |

Men's RP3
| Rank | Name | Qualification | | | | | Final |
| Rank | Name | Route 1 | | Route 2 | | Points | Final |
| Rank | Name | Score | Rank | Score | Rank | Points | Final |
|---|---|---|---|---|---|---|---|
| 1 | (Japan) Tadashi Takano | 42+ | 1 | 28+ | 1 | 1.0 | 49+ |
| 2 | (Netherlands) Jamie Barendrecht | 33+ | 2 | 25+ | 3 | 2.45 | 45+ |
| 3 | (Slovakia) Andrej Haršány | 33 | 3 | 27+ | 2 | 2.45 | 45 |
| 4 | (Switzerland) Matthias Bärtschi | 32 | 5 | 19+ | 4 | 4.47 | 34+ |
| 5 | (United Kingdom) Luke Smith | 32+ | 4 | 19 | 5 | 4.69 | – |
| 6 | (Romania) Liviu - Nicolae Matei | 22+ | 7 | 19 | 5 | 6.42 | – |
| 7 | (France) Bastien Thomas | 27+ | 6 | 18+ | 7 | 6.48 | – |
| 8 | (Iran) Danial Amiri | 22+ | 7 | 5+ | 9 | 8.22 | – |
| 9 | (Switzerland) Andreas Suhner | 15+ | 9 | 9+ | 8 | 8.49 | – |

== Women's results ==
Women's B1
| Rank | Name | Qualification | | | | | Final |
| Rank | Name | Route 1 | | Route 2 | | Points | Final |
| Rank | Name | Score | Rank | Score | Rank | Points | Final |
|---|---|---|---|---|---|---|---|
in B2

Women's B2
| Rank | Name | Qualification | | | | | Final |
| Rank | Name | Route 1 | | Route 2 | | Points | Final |
| Rank | Name | Score | Rank | Score | Rank | Points | Final |
|---|---|---|---|---|---|---|---|
| 1 | (United Kingdom) Abigail Robinson | Top | 1 | Top | 1 | 1.87 | Top |
| 2 | (United States) Seneida Biendarra | Top | 1 | 41+ | 3 | 3.24 | 29+ |
| 3 | (Austria) Edith Scheinecker | Top | 1 | 40+ | 4 | 3.74 | 28 |
| 4 | (Austria) Linda Le Bon | Top | 1 | 42+ | 2 | 2.65 | 25 |
| 5 | (Germany) Ivon Lawerenz | Top | 1 | 35+ | 5 | 4.18 | – |
| 6 | (France) Melissa Cesarone | Top | 1 | 27 | 7 | 4.95 | – |
| 7 | (Japan) Hiromi Aoki | 35 | 9 | 30+ | 6 | 7.35 | – |
| 8 | (Italy) Nadia Bredice | 42+ | 7 | 25+ | 8 | 7.75 | – |
| 9 | (United States) Emeline Lakrout | 42+ | 7 | 24+ | 9 | 8.44 | – |
| 10 | (Romania) Adriana Tofan | 33 | 11 | 24+ | 9 | 10.45 | – |
| 11 | (Switzerland) Laila Grillo | 33 | 11 | 23+ | 11 | 11.25 | – |
| 12 | (United States) Raveena Alli | 34 | 10 | 21 | 13 | 11.4 | – |
| 13 | (Slovenia) Tanja Glusic | 29 | 13 | 22+ | 12 | 12.49 | – |

Women's B3
| Rank | Name | Qualification | | | | | Final |
| Rank | Name | Route 1 | | Route 2 | | Points | Final |
| Rank | Name | Score | Rank | Score | Rank | Points | Final |
|---|---|---|---|---|---|---|---|
| 1 | (India) Sunita Dhondappanavar | 42+ | 2 | 35 | 2 | 2.0 | 29+ |
| 2 | (Japan) Mika Maeoka | Top | 1 | 43 | 1 | 1.0 | 29 |
| 3 | (Japan) Yumi Ejiri | 42 | 3 | 32+ | 3 | 3.0 | 28+ |
| 4 | (United States) Amy Mullins | 39 | 4 | 25+ | 4 | 4.0 | – |
| 5 | (United States) Mandi Curtis | 35 | 5 | 25 | 5 | 5.0 | – |

Women's AL1
| Rank | Name | Qualification | | | | | Final |
| Rank | Name | Route 1 | | Route 2 | | Points | Final |
| Rank | Name | Score | Rank | Score | Rank | Points | Final |
|---|---|---|---|---|---|---|---|
in RP1

Women's AL2
| Rank | Name | Qualification | | | | | Final |
| Rank | Name | Route 1 | | Route 2 | | Points | Final |
| Rank | Name | Score | Rank | Score | Rank | Points | Final |
|---|---|---|---|---|---|---|---|
| 1 | (France) Lucie Jarrige | Top | 1 | 53+ | 1 | 1.0 | Top |
| 2 | (Australia) Sarah Larcombe | 41 | 2 | 41+ | 2 | 2.0 | 27+ |
| 3 | (New Zealand) Rachel Maia | 39+ | 3 | 30+ | 3 | 3.46 | 25 |
| 4 | (United Kingdom) Joanna Newton | 28 | 4 | 30+ | 3 | 4.0 | 23+ |
| 5 | (United States) Mary Tankersley | 22 | 6 | 30+ | 3 | 4.9 | – |
| 6 | (Portugal) Tânia Chaves | 23+ | 5 | 29+ | 6 | 5.48 | – |
| 7 | (Spain) Lucía Martínez Alarma | 17+ | 7 | 25+ | 7 | 7.75 | – |
| 7 | (United States) Kara Parker | 17+ | 7 | 25+ | 7 | 7.75 | – |
| 9 | (Japan) Masako Watanabe | 13+ | 9 | 25+ | 7 | 8.72 | – |
| 10 | (Australia) Jessie Bayiartakis | 13+ | 9 | 24+ | 10 | 9.75 | – |

Women's AU2
| Rank | Name | Qualification | | | | | Final |
| Rank | Name | Route 1 | | Route 2 | | Points | Final |
| Rank | Name | Score | Rank | Score | Rank | Points | Final |
|---|---|---|---|---|---|---|---|
| 1 | (France) Solenne Piret | 34+ | 1 | 50+ | 1 | 1.0 | Top |
| 2 | (Italy) Lucia Capovilla | 27+ | 3 | 36+ | 2 | 2.45 | 26+ (2m12s) |
| 3 | (United States) Maureen Beck | 33+ | 2 | 23+ | 3 | 2.45 | 26+ (2m21s) |
| 4 | (United States) Eleanor Rubin | 13 | 6 | 17 | 4 | 5.1 | 20+ |
| 5 | (Israel) Naama Straussman | 13+ | 5 | 15+ | 5 | 5.48 | – |
| 6 | (Germany) Corinna Wimmer | 17+ | 4 | 13 | 9 | 6.48 | – |
| 7 | (United Kingdom) Isabella Walsh | 13 | 6 | 13+ | 8 | 7.21 | – |
| 8 | (Denmark) Monica Raavig | 12+ | 8 | 15+ | 5 | 7.35 | – |
| 8 | (Switzerland) Amruta Wyssmann | 12+ | 8 | 15+ | 5 | 7.35 | – |
| 10 | (Germany) Carolin Heberle | 12+ | 8 | 13 | 9 | 9.72 | – |
| 11 | (United States) Isabel Benvenuti | 11+ | 11 | 13 | 9 | 10.75 | – |
| 12 | (Spain) María Cabezas Ramos | 10+ | 12 | 13 | 9 | 11.46 | – |
| 13 | (United States) Giovanna Dubuc | 10+ | 12 | 12+ | 13 | 12.75 | – |

Women's AU3
| Rank | Name | Qualification | | | | | Final |
| Rank | Name | Route 1 | | Route 2 | | Points | Final |
| Rank | Name | Score | Rank | Score | Rank | Points | Final |
|---|---|---|---|---|---|---|---|
in RP3

Women's RP1
| Rank | Name | Qualification | | | | | Final |
| Rank | Name | Route 1 | | Route 2 | | Points | Final |
| Rank | Name | Score | Rank | Score | Rank | Points | Final |
|---|---|---|---|---|---|---|---|
| 1 | (Belgium) Pavitra Vandenhoven | 30+ | 4 | 25+ | 1 | 2.45 | 35+ |
| 2 | (United States) Melissa Ruiz | 40 | 1 | 25 | 3 | 1.73 | 28 |
| 3 | (Spain) Marta Peche Salinero | 37 | 2 | 22+ | 4 | 2.83 | 23 |
| 4 | (Netherlands) Eva Mol | 33 | 3 | 25+ | 1 | 2.12 | 14+ |
| 5 | (Spain) Andrea Sánchez Aparicio | 29 | 5 | 15+ | 5 | 5.48 | – |
| 6 | (Switzerland) Angela Fallegger | 26+ | 6 | 15+ | 5 | 6.0 | – |
| 7 | (Spain) Júlia Castelló Farré | 24 | 7 | 15 | 8 | 8.15 | – |
| 8 | (United States) Carlie Cook | 19+ | 12 | 15+ | 5 | 8.49 | – |
| 9 | (United States) Hannah Zook | 23+ | 8 | 15 | 8 | 8.72 | – |
| 10 | (United States) Olivia Conforti | 23 | 9 | 15 | 8 | 9.25 | – |
| 11 | (United Kingdom) Lucy Keyworth | 21 | 10 | 14+ | 12 | 10.95 | – |
| 12 | (Switzerland) Doris Rohner | 19 | 13 | 15 | 8 | 11.11 | – |
| 13 | (Australia) Araminta Mclennan | 20+ | 11 | 10 | 13 | 11.96 | – |
| 14 | (Japan) Asumi Kato | 4 | 14 | 9 | 14 | 14.0 | – |

Women's RP2
| Rank | Name | Qualification | | | | | Final |
| Rank | Name | Route 1 | | Route 2 | | Points | Final |
| Rank | Name | Score | Rank | Score | Rank | Points | Final |
|---|---|---|---|---|---|---|---|
| 1 | (Norway) Dina Eivik | 22+ | 2 | 30+ | 2 | 2.0 | 29+ |
| 2 | (Austria) Jasmin Plank | 22 | 3 | 41+ | 1 | 1.73 | 28+ |
| 3 | (United States) Anna Devries | 13 | 4 | 24+ | 3 | 3.46 | 25 |
| 4 | (Switzerland) Sarah Longhi | 23+ | 1 | 21+ | 4 | 2.12 | 23+ |
| 5 | (Spain) Beatriz Gandara Carnero | 6 | 6 | 21+ | 4 | 5.41 | – |
| 6 | (Germany) Nicole Diehl | 12 | 5 | 19 | 6 | 5.48 | – |
| 7 | (United States) Emily Seelenfreund | 6 | 6 | 14+ | 7 | 6.75 | – |

Women's RP3
| Rank | Name | Qualification | | | | | Final |
| Rank | Name | Route 1 | | Route 2 | | Points | Final |
| Rank | Name | Score | Rank | Score | Rank | Points | Final |
|---|---|---|---|---|---|---|---|
| 1 | (Brazil) Marina Dias | 39 | 3 | 50+ | 1 | 1.73 | 42+ |
| 2 | (Netherlands) Christiane Luttikhuizen | Top | 1 | 47+ | 4 | 2.0 | 42+ (3m52s) |
| 3 | (United Kingdom) Martha Evans | 41+ | 2 | 50 | 2 | 2.0 | 42+ (4m45s) |
| 4 | (Germany) Rosalie Schaupert | 38 | 5 | 49+ | 3 | 3.87 | 42+ |
| 5 | (United States) Nat Vorel | 38+ | 4 | 44 | 5 | 4.47 | – |
| 6 | (United Kingdom) Anita Aggarwal | 29 | 6 | 40+ | 6 | 6.0 | – |
| 7 | (Spain) Paula De La Calle Pizarro | 22 | 8 | 39+ | 7 | 7.94 | – |
| 8 | (Germany) Laura Nesciobelli | 22 | 8 | 35+ | 8 | 8.49 | – |
| 9 | (Germany) Ria Grindel | 27 | 7 | 15+ | 11 | 8.77 | – |
| 10 | (Slovenia) Manca Smrekar | 22 | 8 | 27 | 9 | 9.0 | – |
| 11 | (United States) Lindsay Purcell | 21 | 11 | 17+ | 10 | 10.49 | – |
