= We're the Superhumans =

2016 television advert

- Agency: 4Creative; Blink
- Client: Channel 4
- Release date: 15 July 2016

"We're the Superhumans" is a television advert which was produced by Channel 4 to promote its broadcast of the 2016 Summer Paralympics. Serving as a follow-up to Meet the Superhumans (which was used to promote the 2012 Summer Paralympics in London), the advert featured people of various backgrounds and disabilities (including several British Paralympic athletes) performing different activities and physical feats. It was set to a performance of the Sammy Davis Jr. song "Yes I Can" by a band composed of musicians with disabilities.

We're the Superhumans received wide acclaim, and won the overall award in film at the 2017 Cannes Lions Festival. The advert faced criticism for allegedly conveying unrealistic expectations of people with disabilities, stemming from Channel 4's marketing campaigns for the Paralympics having promoted the athletes as having "superhuman" traits. Channel 4 stated that it worked with disability organizations to ensure its portrayals were accurate, while participant Alvin Law argued that the broadcaster was merely intending to promote Paralympic athletes as having the same athletic qualities as Olympic athletes.

== Production ==
Channel 4 acquired the UK television rights to the 2012 Summer Paralympics in London, succeeding the BBC. Through a major advertising campaign, the broadcaster sought to promote the Paralympics as being an "event in its own right", as opposed to an afterthought to the Olympic Games which precede them. An aspect of this campaign was a trailer entitled "Meet the Superhumans", which showcased the athletic and "superhuman" qualities of Paralympic sport. The advert was widely acclaimed, and won a Golden Lion at the 2013 Cannes Lions Festival in June 2013, but lost the Grand Prix to the railway safety PSA Dumb Ways to Die. Sir John Hegarty, the jury president, explained that "When you've got some really outstanding work it is tragic in some ways it can't get a bigger award, but there can only be one grand prix", while jury member Carlo Cavallone added "[Meet the Superhumans] is an amazing campaign, one of the golds that went through [the judging process] immediately ... Everyone felt it had the highest level of craft. It puts an issue that was really important before London 2012 to raise awareness of the Paralympics [and] they were hyper successful — Dumb Ways to Die was a tough contender."

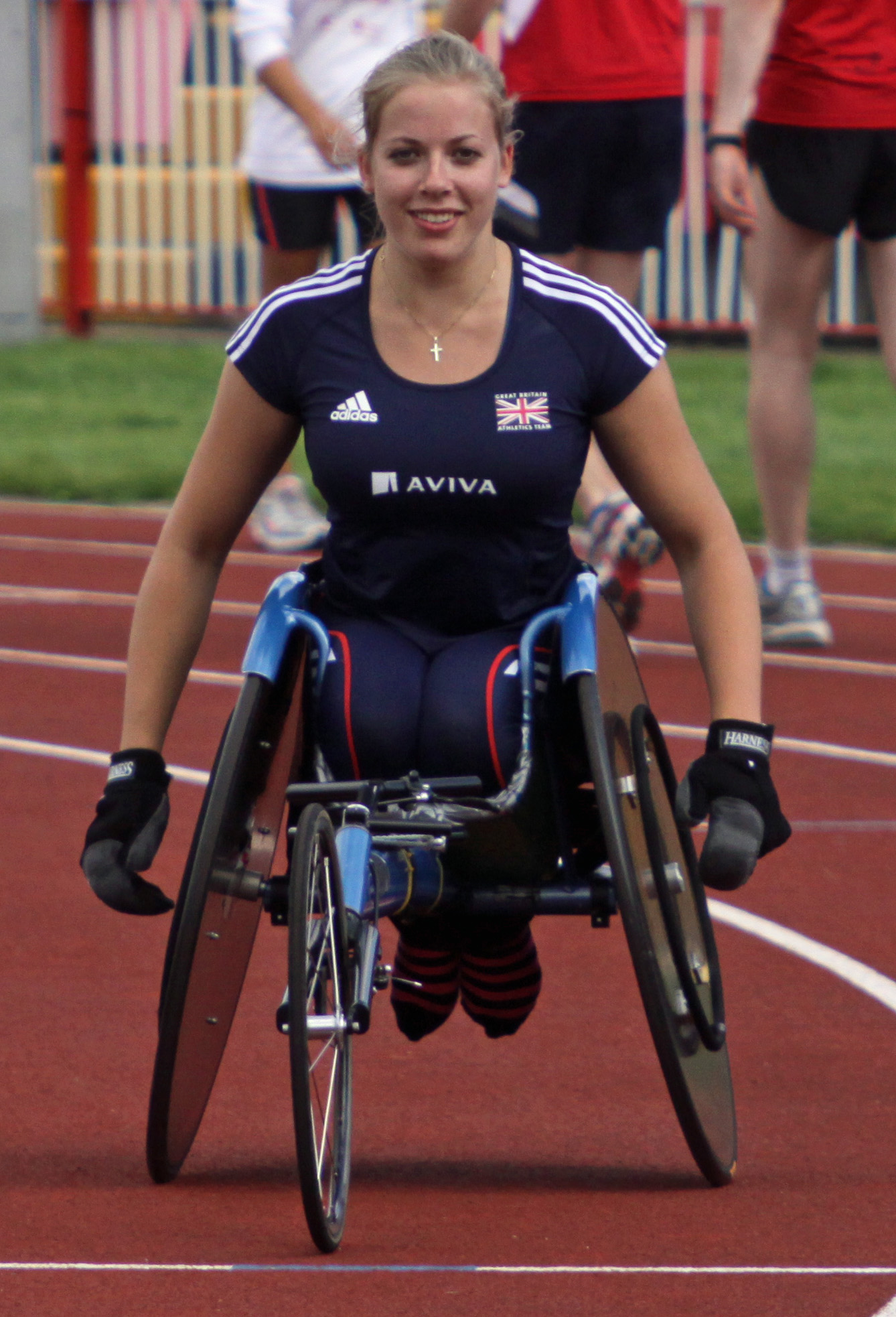
British wheelchair racer Hannah Cockroft appeared in "We're the Superhumans".

We're the Superhumans was produced by Blink and Channel 4's in-house agency 4Creative, and filmed in 12 days across Britain. Channel 4's marketing and communications chief Dan Brooke explained that their goal was expand upon the concept of the previous advert by featuring "everyday" people with disabilities, in addition to para-athletes. He stated that the ad was "an unbridled celebration of ability, by both elite Paralympians and everyday people", and that "[we] wanted to say any disabled person can be a superhuman. You have everyday people doing amazing things. There are more disabled people in [this] one advert than in the whole history of British advertising altogether."

Over 140 people with disabilities from various countries were cast for the ad, including 39 Paralympic athletes. Notable people appearing in the ad included wheelchair stunt performer Aaron Fotheringham, Polish driver Bartek Ostalowski (who began driving adapted race cars after losing his arms in a motorcycle accident), Jessica Cox (an American who was the first armless person to earn a pilot's certificate), as well as British Paralympic athletes Natalie Blake, Hannah Cockroft, Matthew Phillips, and Ellie Simmonds.

The advert is set to a cover of the Sammy Davis Jr. song "Yes I Can", performed by a big band ensemble of musicians with disabilities. Alvin Law of Canada, who is seen drumming with his feet in the opening scene, was born without arms due to side effects of his mother's use of the drug thalidomide. The singer, Tony Dee of Brisbane, Australia, has spina bifida and was discovered by Channel 4 from a YouTube video of him singing "Come Fly with Me". Director Dougal Wilson personally flew to Brisbane to meet Dee and record a demo of him singing "Yes I Can". The final recording took place at Studio Two of the Abbey Road Studios.

== Release and reception ==
We're the Superhumans premiered on 15 July 2016. Versions of the advert were also available with audio descriptions, subtitling, and BSL interpretation for the visually and hearing impaired.

Within four days of its premiere, We're the Superhumans was viewed at least 23 million times online. The introduction of the advert and its associated campaign had a higher percentage of user engagement on Twitter than the release of the BBC's 2016 Summer Olympics trailer. The recording of "Yes I Can" was released as a charity single through Universal Music Group, with proceeds benefiting the British Paralympic Association. On 29 July 2016, Tim Worner, CEO of the Seven Network—the new rightsholder of the Paralympics in Australia as of 2016, stated at the Sports Marketing Summit that it would be making a localised version of the campaign to promote its inaugural coverage.

Adweek described the ad as being "joyous" and "awesomely over-the-top", stating that "the message is considerably broader in scope and more sweeping than the 2012 spot, and the nonstop positive vibes—driven by imaginative set pieces and inspired editing—are incredibly infectious." At the 2017 Cannes Lions Festival, We're the Superhumans finished in second place for Film Craft, and won the Grand Prix for film. Acknowledging its diversity and gender equality, jury president Pete Kavat stated that the advert was "bold" and "proud", and "pushes humanity forward".

The advert was criticised for allegedly portraying unrealistic expectations of people with disabilities; British disability activist Penny Pepper wrote in a Guardian editorial that "The hyping of disabled athletes into superhuman status by Channel 4 only deepens our wounds, inflicted by continual assaults on our daily lives. It truly seems that the only acceptable disabled person is a Paralympian – and then only for a few weeks", and that "the superhuman shtick is a tiresome diversion away from what is important. Let us be ordinary, let us be every day and let us at least have rights. Rights to independent living."

Similarly, University of Ottawa PhD candidate Celeste Orr criticised the ad and the concept of a "superhuman" portrayal of disabled people in general as an example of the "supercrip" stereotype, explaining that "promoting the idea that people with disabilities can overcome their disabilities, be happy, and even become amazing elite athletes if they shift their attitudes – if they just declare, 'Yes I can' – encourages enabled individuals to think of disability as a personal issue, not a socio-political issue that they influence. Inspiration porn, such as 'We're the Superhumans,' helps enabled people remain complicit in reproducing literal and symbolic ableist structures and ideologies."

To ensure that the advert's portrayal of people with disabilities were not skewed towards unrealistic expectations, Channel 4 had worked with partner charities, including Action on Hearing Loss, the Royal National Institute of Blind People, and Scope. Alvin Law defended his participation, arguing that the intent of the trailer was to promote the Paralympic Games and make viewers realise that Paralympic athletes were "just as talented as the 'real ones'". He went on to explain that "I started doing audacious things like this in 1981 to show people an extreme to get them to move to the middle. That's exactly what this project is all about."

Awards
Preceded by Love freebies? Get them legally aka Shoplifters	Cannes Lions Film Grand Prix Winner; 2017	Succeeded by It's a Tide Ad and My Black Is Beautiful: The Talk
