= Matthew Phillips (climber) =

British paraclimber (born 2000)

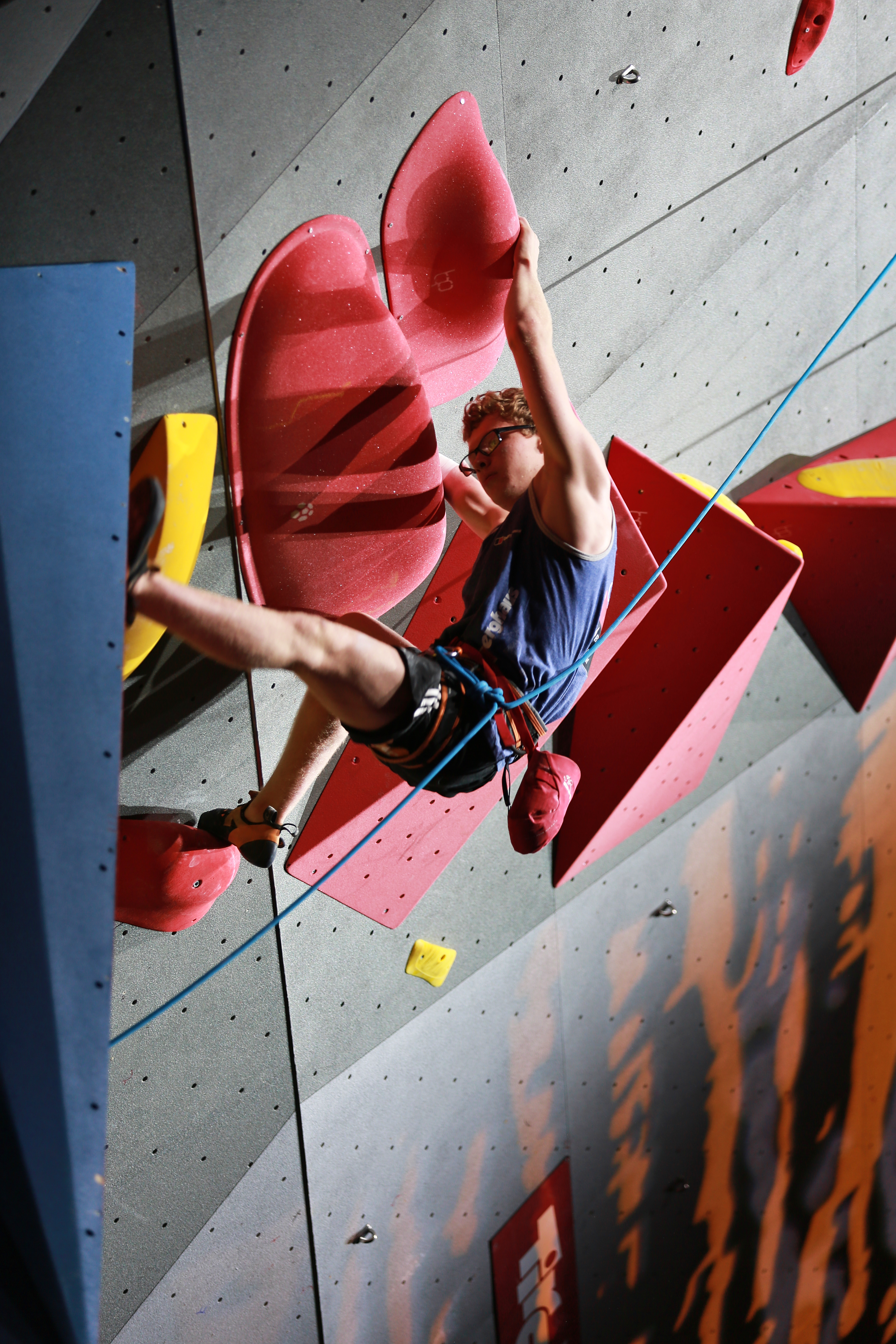
- Matt on his Final's climb at IFSC Climbing World Championships 2018 in Innsbruck

Personal information
- Nickname: Matt
- Born: 14 November 2000 (age 25) Farnborough, Hampshire, England
- Occupation: Climbing instructor
- Website: www.matthewphillips.me.uk

Climbing career
- Type of climber: Sport climbing, bouldering
- Highest grade: 7a (5.11d), V5 (6C/6C+)
- Major ascents: Reefer Madness, 6c Clear Creek (Colorado), USA
- World finals: World Champion 2018, 2019, 2021 AU2 Category
- Known for: Member of GB Paraclimbing Team 2016-Present
Medal record
World Championships
Gold medal – first place	2018 Innsbruck	Paraclimbing
Gold medal – first place	2019 Briançon	Paraclimbing
Gold medal – first place	2021 Moscow	Paraclimbing
World Cup
Gold medal – first place	2018 Briançon	Paraclimbing
Gold medal – first place	2017 Sheffield	Paraclimbing
Silver medal – second place	2017 Edinburgh	Paraclimbing
Gold medal – first place	2016 Sheffield	Paraclimbing
Gold medal – first place	2016 Campitello di Fassa	Paraclimbing
Paraclimbing Masters
Bronze medal – third place	2019 Imst	Paraclimbing
Silver medal – second place	2016 Imst	Paraclimbing
British Paraclimbing Series
Gold medal – first place	2018	Paraclimbing
Gold medal – first place	2018	Paraclimbing
Gold medal – first place	2018	Paraclimbing
Gold medal – first place	2018	Paraclimbing
Gold medal – first place	2017	Paraclimbing
Gold medal – first place	2017	Paraclimbing
Gold medal – first place	2017	Paraclimbing
Gold medal – first place	2017	Paraclimbing
Gold medal – first place	2016	Paraclimbing
Gold medal – first place	2016	Paraclimbing
Gold medal – first place	2016	Paraclimbing
Gold medal – first place	2016	Paraclimbing
British Paraclimbing Championship
Gold medal – first place	2019	Paraclimbing
British Parabouldering Championship
Blokfest Para Festival
Gold medal – first place	2019	Paraclimbing
Paraclimb Scotland
Gold medal – first place	2019	ParaClimbing
Gold medal – first place	2019	ParaSpeed
- Updated on 10 September 2019

Matthew Phillips is a British paraclimber. He competed on the Great Britain Paraclimbing Team, where he was the youngest member, and is a 3 times World Champion in the AU2 (Upper Arm Amputation) category. He was coached by Head Coach Robin O'Leary. He is currently taking a break from competing and concerntrating on building his coaching and routesetting before looking to possibly try out for the Paralympics in 2028.

== Biography ==
Phillips was born missing his right lower arm from the elbow down. He started out as a national swimmer, but switched to climbing when he was around 13. He attended Salesian College in Farnborough. He started climbing seriously in 2014. In 2016 he was featured in the Channel 4's Paralympics trailer 'We're the Superhumans'. in 2018 he won the Young Sports Personality of the Year in the Sport Guildford Awards.

He left school in 2019 and spent time in Boulder, Colorado climbing with his coach Robin O'Leary and a number of US climbers. Whilst out there he was joined by film maker David Petts of Volo Digital to film footage for the film 'One of Kind' which is available on Epic TV YouTube channel. Phillips returned to the United Kingdom where he now works as a Climbing Instructor at Surrey Summit, alongside competing.

== Filmography ==
- July 2016 – We're the Superhumans, television advert produced by Channel 4 for 2016 Summer Paralympics
- May 2018 – At Arms Length, YouTube produced by Teri Limongi
- Dec 2018 – Matthew Phillips Shows Us His Moves At Blokfest Brighton | Climbing Daily Ep.1315, YouTube produced by Epic TV Climbing Daily
- May 2020 – One of a Kind, YouTube produced by David Petts
- Sep 7 2021 – Sport Climbing Caves On The UK Coast, YouTube produced by EpicTV
- Sep 28 2021 – Day in the Life of a Route Setting World Champion, YouTube produced by EpicTV
- Nov 2 2021 – Steep + Powerful: Bouldering At Lulworth Cove, YouTube produced by EpicTV

== Competitions ==
Phillips has competed in a number of national and international competitions. In 2016 he won the Paraclimbing Cup in June in Italy, and in September in Sheffield. In 2017 he finished second at the Cup in Edinburgh and first at the Cup in Sheffield. In 2018 he won both the Cup in Briançon and the World Championships in Innsbruck.

In the ParaClimb Scotland 2019 Competition Phillips took gold in what is thought to have been the first Para-Speed Climbing event, on an international approved speed wall, in the United Kingdom with a time of 25.36s. Although his personal best came on the first qualifying route at 23.11s.

In 2019 he successfully defended his world title by winning a gold medal at the World Paraclimbing Championships in Briançon in France. He became Three times World Paraclimbing Champion in 2021 when he won Gold in Moscow
