= Alton School =

Coordinates: 51°9′36.31″N 0°58′0.1″W

Location
- Anstey Lane; Alton, Hampshire, GU34 2NG; England

Information
- Type: Private day school
- Motto: Be The Best That You Can Be
- Religious affiliation: Roman Catholic
- Established: 1938
- Founder: Sister Madeleine de Jesu - Convent of Our Lady of Providence
- Closed: 2024
- Department for Education URN: 116537 Tables
- Chairman of Governors: Clive Hexton
- Headmaster: Andrew Reeve
- Gender: Coeducational 6 months to 18
- Age: 6mths to 18
- Enrolment: 520~
- Colour: Blue
- Website: http://www.altonschool.co.uk

Alton School was an independent Catholic day school on the outskirts of Alton, Hampshire for boys and girls from 6 months to 18 years. Before its closure, it had approximately 450 pupils of all faiths. Situated on a 19-acre (77,000 m^{2}) campus, it had a nursery, prep, senior and 6th form.

== History ==
Alton Convent School was established in 1938 by the Sisters of Our Lady of Providence. The original site of the school was in Normandy Street, London.

In 1946, the Town Council acquired Anstey Manor and its land. In turn it sold the manor house and 11 acres to the Alton Convent for £6,000. As a result the school relocated to Anstey Manor House in Alton, Hampshire. The school changed its name from Alton Convent School to Alton School and started to admit boys in years 7 and 12 in September 2018, having previously been all-girls at the senior level. In May 2024, it was announced that the school would close at the end of the academic year without reopening due to a 'continued decline in pupil numbers' and a ‘combination of adverse political and economic factors’.

== Curriculum ==
Senior School subjects were divided into Core, Additional and Extended which allowed pupils to learn at their own paces. Pupils took ten GCSE subjects and could have chosen from a variety of electives including separate sciences, law, photography, geography, history, art and drama. All students took Religious Studies GCSE in year 10.

== Activities ==
Some events and activities were organised jointly with sister Catholic school Salesian College in nearby Farnborough. The school hosted a joint Michaelmas ball with nearby More House School.

== Notable alumni ==
- Alison Goldfrapp - vocalist of Goldfrapp
- Catherine and Lizzy Ward Thomas, musicians
- Catherine McCormack - actress
