= Paraclimbing World Climbing Championship =

The Paraclimbing World Climbing Championships are the biennial world championships for competition climbing for people with disabilities organized by the International Federation of Sport Climbing (now World Climbing). This event determines the male and female world champions in various categories. The first event was organized in Arco in 2011, which was held together with the World Climbing Championships.

== Championships ==
Edition	Year	Location	Date(s)	Disciplines		Athletes	Nations	Website	Notes
Edition	Year	Location	Date(s)	Lead	Speed	Athletes	Nations	Website	Notes
1	2011	(Italy) Arco	18–19 July	X	X				
2	2012	(France) Paris	12–16 September	X					
3	2014	(Spain) Gijón	11–14 September	X					
4	2016	(France) Paris	14–18 September	X					
5	2018	(Austria) Innsbruck	10–16 September	X					
6	2019	(France) Briançon	16–17 July	X					
7	2021	(Russia) Moscow	15–17 September	X					
8	2023	(Switzerland) Bern	1–12 August	X					
9	2025	(South Korea) Seoul	20–25 September	X					

== Classifications and Categories ==
A wide range of different people take part in Paraclimbing, including visually impaired climbers, climbers with limb differences and those with brain injuries or mobility impairments. Higher numbers equate to higher functionality (less impairment), lower numbers equate to lower functionality (more impairment).

Paraclimbing categories according to the 2024 IFSC regulations
Category		Criteria	Example image
Visual impairment	B1	Visual acuity is poorer than LogMAR 2.60 (blindness)	
Visual impairment	B2	LogMAR of 1.50 − 2.60 and/or visual field of less than 10°	
Visual impairment	B3	LogMAR of 1 − 1.40 (20/200 − 20/500 on the Snellen chart) and/or visual field of less than 40°	
Upper limb(s)	AU2	One upper limb has reduced function below the athletes elbow and does not have a functional wrist joint	
Upper limb(s)	AU3	One hand or multiple digits across both hands are absent or have reduced function	
Lower limb(s)	AL1	Significantly reduced functional use for climbing or absence of bilateral lower limbs	
Lower limb(s)	AL2	Impairment in a single lower limb or leg length difference	
Range and power	RP1	Impairment across all eligible impairment types with severe impairment to function affecting at least 2 limbs or a single upper limb is absent or has severely limited functional use	
Range and power	RP2	Impairment across all eligible impairment types with moderate impairment to function affecting the trunk and/or limbs	
Range and power	RP3	Impairment across all eligible impairment types with mild impairment to function affecting the trunk and/or limbs	

In the 2022-2023 season AU1 was permanently combined with RP1, and a new category of upper arm limb difference was added. AU3 is the designated sport class for athletes with limb differences between the wrist and tips of the fingers. With a minimum impairment of a loss of 6 finger joints across both hands. Prior to the creation of this sport class many AU3 athletes classified in RP3.

=== Merging ===
Merging order of paraclimbing categories. Since 2023, AU1 has been permanently merged into RP1.

If there is an insufficient number of competitors in a given category, this category can be merged into another, 'harder' category. In world championships at least six athletes from four countries must compete in each category. Merges may be performed sequentially until the required number of competitors is met.

== Men's results ==
=== Speed ===
Year	Category	Gold	Silver	Bronze
2011	Amputee Arm PD	(Russia) Mikhail Saparov	-	-
2011	Amputee Both Leg PD	(China) Boyu Xia	-	-
2011	Amputee Leg PD	(Spain) Urko Carmona Barandiaran	(Germany) Günther Grausam	(Italy) Oliviero Bellinzani
2011	Arthritis+Neurological PD	(Hungary) András Szijártó	(Italy) Matteo Alberghini	(France) Philippe Ribière
2011	Complete Neurological Leg Disability PD	(Germany) Sebastian Richter	-	-
2011	Visual Impairment B1	(Italy) Matteo Stefani	(Spain) Manuel Cepero Gutierrez	(Russia) Roman Kostyakov
2011	Visual Impairment B2	(Italy) Simone Salvagnin	(Italy) Oliviero Bellinzani	-
2011	Visual Impairment B3	(Spain) Domingo Carretero Campon	(Spain) Ricardo Pérez Amado	-

=== Lead ===
Year	Category	Gold	Silver	Bronze
2011	Amputee Arm PD	(Russia) Mikhail Saparov	-	-
2011	Amputee Both Leg PD	(China) Boyu Xia	-	-
2011	Amputee Leg PD	(Japan) Mineo Ono	(Spain) Urko Carmona Barandiaran	(Germany) Alexander Biermann
2011	Arthritis+Neurological PD	(Hungary) András Szijártó	(Italy) Matteo Masento	(Italy) Alessio Cornamusini
2011	Complete Neurological Leg Disability PD	(Germany) Sebastian Richter	-	-
2011	Visual Impairment B1	(Italy) Matteo Stefani	(Spain) Manuel Cepero Gutierrez	(Russia) Roman Kostyakov
2011	Visual Impairment B2	(Japan) Koichiro Kobayashi	(Japan) Masayoshi Idomoto	(Italy) Simone Salvagnin
2011	Visual Impairment B3	(Spain) Ricardo Pérez Amado	(Spain) Domingo Carretero Campon	-
2012	Amputee Leg PD	(Spain) Urko Carmona Barandiaran	(Japan) Mineo Ono	(United States) Craig Demartino
2012	Arthritis+Neurological PD1	(India) Manikandan Kumar	(Brazil) Raphael Nishimura	(France) Mathieu Besnard
2012	Visual Impairment B1	(France) Nicolas Moineau	(Japan) Kenji Iwamoto	(Italy) Matteo Stefani
2012	Visual Impairment B2	(Japan) Sho Aita	(Japan) Koichiro Kobayashi	(Italy) Simone Salvagnin
2014	Amputee Leg PD	(Spain) Urko Carmona Barandiaran	(United States) Ronald Dickson	(United States) Craig Demartino
2014	Visual Impairment B1	(Japan) Koichiro Kobayashi	(France) Nicolas Moineau	(Italy) Matteo Stefani
2014	Neurological Physical Disability A	(France) Mathieu Besnard	(India) Manikandan Kumar	(Iran) Behnam Khalaji
2014	Neurological Physical Disability B	(Hungary) András Szijártó	(Italy) Alessio Cornamusini	(France) Serge Laurencin
2016	B1	(Japan) Koichiro Kobayashi	(France) Nicolas Moineau	(Italy) Matteo Stefani
2016	B2	(Japan) Sho Aita	(France) Mathieu Barbe	(Italy) Simone Salvagnin
2016	AL-2	(Spain) Albert Guardia Ferrer	(France) Julien Gasc	(Spain) Iván Germán Pascual
2016	RP1	(Germany) Korbinian Franck	(Germany) Nils Helsper	(United States) Connor King
2016	RP2	(Israel) Nive Porat	(Italy) Alessio Cornamusini	(Russia) Vladimir Netsvetaev-Dolgalev
2016	RP3	(France) Romain Pagnoux	(France) Mathieu Besnard	(Slovenia) Gregor Selak
2018	AU-2	(United Kingdom) Matthew Phillips	(United States) Trevor Smith	(Russia) Maksim Maiorov
2018	B1	(Japan) Koichiro Kobayashi	(Italy) Matteo Stefani	(Spain) Francisco Javier Aguilar Amoedo
2018	B2	(United States) Justin Salas	(Spain) Raul Simon Franco	(Japan) Fumiya Hamanoue
2018	AL-2	(France) Thierry Delarue	(Spain) Urko Carmona Barandiaran	(Spain) Albert Guardia Ferrer
2018	RP1	(Italy) Alessio Cornamusini	(Germany) Korbinian Franck	(Germany) Nils Helsper
2018	RP2	(Iran) Behnam Khalaji	(Israel) Nive Porat	(India) Manikandan Kumar
2018	RP3	(France) Romain Pagnoux	(United Kingdom) Michael Cleverdon	(Slovenia) Gregor Selak
2019	AU-2	(United Kingdom) Matthew Phillips	(Israel) Mor Michael Sapir	(Germany) Kevin Bartke
2019	B1	(Japan) Koichiro Kobayashi	(Spain) Francisco Javier Aguilar Amoedo	(Russia) Daniil Lisichenko
2019	B2	(Japan) Sho Aita	(United States) Justin Salas	(United Kingdom) Richard Slocock
2019	B3	(Romania) Cosmin Florin Candoi	(United Kingdom) Lux Losey Sail	(Japan) Motohiro Ejiri
2019	AL-2	(France) Thierry Delarue	(Spain) Urko Carmona Barandiaran	(Spain) Albert Guardia Ferrer
2019	RP1	(France) Bastien Thomas	(Italy) Alessio Cornamusini	(Germany) Korbinian Franck
2019	RP2	(Iran) Behnam Khalaji	(United States) Benjamin Mayforth	(India) Manikandan Kumar
2019	RP3	(France) Romain Pagnoux	(France) Mathieu Besnard	(Slovenia) Gregor Selak
2021	B1	(Japan) Sho Aita	(Romania) Razvan Nedu	(United Kingdom) Jesse Dufton
2021	B2	(Japan) Fumiya Hamanoue	(United Kingdom) Richard Slocock	(Spain) Raul Simon Franco
2021	RP1	(Austria) Angelino Zeller	(United States) Tanner Cislaw	(Germany) Korbinian Franck
2021	RP2	(Israel) Mor Michael Sapir	(United States) Benjamin Mayforth	(France) Bastien Thomas
2021	RP3	(France) Romain Pagnoux	(France) Mathieu Besnard	(Iran) Iman Edrisi
2021	AL1	(France) Thierry Delarue	(Belgium) Frederik Leys	(Japan) Shuhei Yuki
2021	AU2	(United Kingdom) Matthew Phillips	(United States) Brian Zarzuela	(Germany) Kevin Bartke
2023	B1	(Japan) Sho Aita	(Spain) Francisco Javier Aguilar Amoedo	(Romania) Răzvan Nedu
2023	B2	(Japan) Fumiya Hamanoue	(United Kingdom) Richard Slocock	(Spain) Guillermo Pelegrín Gómez
2023	B3	(Romania) Cosmin Florin Candoi	(Japan) Kazuhiro Minowada	(United Kingdom) Lux Losey Sail
2023	AL1	(Austria) Angelino Zeller	(Austria) Markus Pösendorfer	(United States) Tanner Cislaw
2023	AL2	(France) Thierry Delarue	(United States) Ethan Zilz	(Spain) Albert Guardia Ferrer
2023	AU2	(Norway) Isak Ripman	(Germany) Kevin Bartke	(United States) Brian Zarzuela
2023	AU3	(Israel) Mor Michael Sapir	(Japan) Nobuhiro Yusaraoka	(Switzerland) Dominic Geisseler
2023	RP1	(France) Aloïs Pottier	(United States) Elliott Nguyen	(Japan) Takuya Okada
2023	RP2	(Israel) Mor Michael Sapir	(United States) Benjamin Mayforth	(France) Bastien Thomas
2023	RP3	(Spain) Iván Muñoz Escolar	(United States) Benjamin Mayforth	(India) Manikandan Kumar

== Women's Results ==
=== Speed ===
Year	Category	Gold	Silver	Bronze
2011	Amputee Arm PD	(Spain) Paula De la Calle Pizarro	-	-
2011	Arthritis+Neurological PD	(Ukraine) Valentyna Kurshakova	-	-
2011	Visual Impairment B1	(Italy) Silvia Parente	(Russia) Dilyara Rakhmankulova	-
2011	Visual Impairment B2	(Russia) Tatiana Panova	-	-

=== Lead ===
Year	Category	Gold	Silver	Bronze
2011	Amputee Arm PD	(Spain) Paula De la Calle Pizarro	-	-
2011	Arthritis+Neurological PD	(Ukraine) Valentyna Kurshakova	-	-
2011	Visual Impairment B1	(Russia) Dilyara Rakhmankulova	(Italy) Silvia Parente	-
2011	Visual Impairment B2	(Russia) Tatiana Panova	-	-
2012	Visual Impairment	(Russia) Dilyara Rakhmankulova	(Italy) Silvia Parente	(Italy) Giulia Poggioli
2012	Physical Disability	(United Kingdom) Frances Brown	(Italy) Silvia Giacobbo Dal Prà	(Ukraine) Valentyna Kurshakova
2014	Amputee Leg PD	(United States) Christa Brelsford	(Canada) Kate Sawford	(United Kingdom) Esme Harte
2014	Visual Impairment B2	(Italy) Alessia Refolo	(Slovenia) Tanja Glusic	(Italy) Giulia Poggioli
2014	Neurological Physical Disability A	(Belgium) Elodie Orbaen	(Italy) Tiziana Paolini	(France) Oriane Moreno
2016	AU-2	(United States) Maureen Beck	(Hungary) Melinda Vigh	(Italy) Lucia Capovilla
2016	AL-2	(France) Lucie Jarrige	(Canada) Kate Sawford	(United Kingdom) Esme Harte
2016	RP3	(Belgium) Elodie Orbaen	(France) Oriane Moreno	(Japan) Aika Yoshida
2018	AU-2	(France) Solenne Piret	(Hungary) Melinda Vigh	(United States) Maureen Beck
2018	B2	(United Kingdom) Abigail Robinson	(United States) Whiteny Pesek	(Slovenia) Tanja Glusic
2018	AL-2	(France) Lucie Jarrige	(Canada) Kate Sawford	(United States) Emily Stephenson
2018	RP2	(United Kingdom) Hannah Baldwin	(France) Marlene Prat	(United Kingdom) Anita Aggarwal
2018	RP3	(Japan) Aika Yoshida	(Japan) Momoko Yoshida	(Belgium) Elodie Orbaen
2019	AU-2	(France) Solenne Piret	(United States) Maureen Beck	(Hungary) Melinda Vigh
2019	B2	(United Kingdom) Abigail Robinson	(Japan) Yumi Ejiri	(Austria) Edith Scheinecker
2019	AL-2	(France) Lucie Jarrige	(United Kingdom) Joanna Newton	(Germany) Jaqueline Fritz
2019	RP2	(United Kingdom) Hannah Baldwin	(United Kingdom) Anita Aggarwal	(United Kingdom) Leanora Volpe
2019	RP3	(Japan) Aika Yoshida	(Japan) Momoko Yoshida	(United Kingdom) Martha Evans
2021	B2	(United Kingdom) Abigail Robinson	(Austria) Edith Scheinecker	(Italy) Nadia Bredice
2021	B3	(Romania) Ionela Grecu	(Slovenia) Tanja Glusic	(Indonesia) Sunita Dhondappanavar
2021	RP1	(Belgium) Pavitra Vandenhoven	(Netherlands) Eva Mol	(Spain) Marta Peche Salinero
2021	RP2	(France) Solenne Piret	(United Kingdom) Leanora Volpe	(Italy) Lucia Capovilla
2021	RP3	(France) Lucie Jarrige	(United Kingdom) Martha Evans	(Austria) Katharina Ritt
2023	B1	in B2		
2023	B2	(United Kingdom) Abigail Robinson	(United States) Seneida Biendarra	(Austria) Edith Scheinecker
2023	B3	(India) Sunita Dhondappanavar	(Japan) Mika Maeoka	(Japan) Yumi Ejiri
2023	AL1	in RP1		
2023	AL2	(France) Lucie Jarrige	(Australia) Sarah Larcombe	(Australia) Rachel Maia
2023	AU2	(France) Solenne Piret	(Italy) Lucia Capovilla	(United States) Maureen Beck
2023	AU3	in RP3		
2023	RP1	(Belgium) Pavitra Vandenhoven	(United States) Melissa Ruiz	(Spain) Marta Peche Salinero
2023	RP2	(Norway) Dina Eivik	(Austria) Jasmin Plank	(United States) Anna Devries
2023	RP3	(Brazil) Marina Dias	(Netherlands) Christiane Luttikhuizen	(United Kingdom) Martha Evans
2025	B1			
2025	B2			
2025	B3			
2025	AL1	in RP1		
2025	AL2			
2025	AU2			
2025	AU3			
2025	RP1			
2025	RP2			
2025	RP3			
