= Melinda Vigh =

Hungarian climber (1982–2021)

Personal information
- Nationality: Hungarian
- Born: 2 May 1982 Budapest, Hungarian People's Republic
- Died: 7 August 2021 (aged 39) Watzmann, Germany
Medal record
World Championships
Silver medal – second place	2016 Paris	Paraclimbing
Silver medal – second place	2018 Innsbruck	Paraclimbing
Bronze medal – third place	2019 Briançon	Paraclimbing

Melinda Vigh (2 May 1982 – 7 August 2021) was a Hungarian climber. A forearm amputee, she competed in the disability group AU2.

== Biography ==
Vigh finished second at the 2016 IFSC Paraclimbing World Championships in Paris and in 2018 in Innsbruck. In the 2019 Briançon competition, she finished third.

Melinda Vigh died from an accidental fall while climbing the Watzmann on 7 August 2021 at the age of 39.
