= Jesse Dufton =

British mountaineer

Personal information
- Nationality: British
- Born: 1985

Climbing career
- Type of climber: traditional climbing, competition climbing
- Known for: First blind climber to lead an ascent on the Old Man of Hoy

Jesse Dufton is a British rock climber and member of the Great Britain paraclimbing team since 2017. In 2019, Dufton became the first blind climber to lead an ascent on Old Man of Hoy in the Orkney Islands. The climb, and Dufton's story, were the subject of the 2020 film Climbing Blind. Dufton has rod-cone dystrophy; he was born severely sight impaired and has no useful sight left today.
