= Maureen Beck =

American mountaineer

Maureen Beck is an American mountaineer, and a specialist in adaptive climbing. Born without a lower left arm, she has won six national titles, and won a gold medal at the 2014 Spanish Paraclimbing World Championships.

Beck is from Ellsworth, Maine, and a graduate of the University of Vermont. She was inspired to take up climbing at the age of 12 after a counsellor said she did not have to do it on a camp course. Because there was no support for one-handed climbing, she devised a way of doing it herself. She accompanied Jim Ewing in a climb of the Lotus Flower Tower in the Cirque of the Unclimbables.

The 2018 documentary "Stumped" centered on Beck and her climbing career.

== Honors and awards ==
In 2019 Beck was named National Geographic Adventurer of the Year. In May of 2022, Beck placed second at the IFSC Paraclimbing World Cup.

== Filmography ==
- Reel Rock S11 E6: Stumped (2017)
- Craig's Reaction (2018)
- Fine Lines (2019)
- Adaptive (2019)
