= Paraclimbing =

Competitive climbing for persons with disabilities

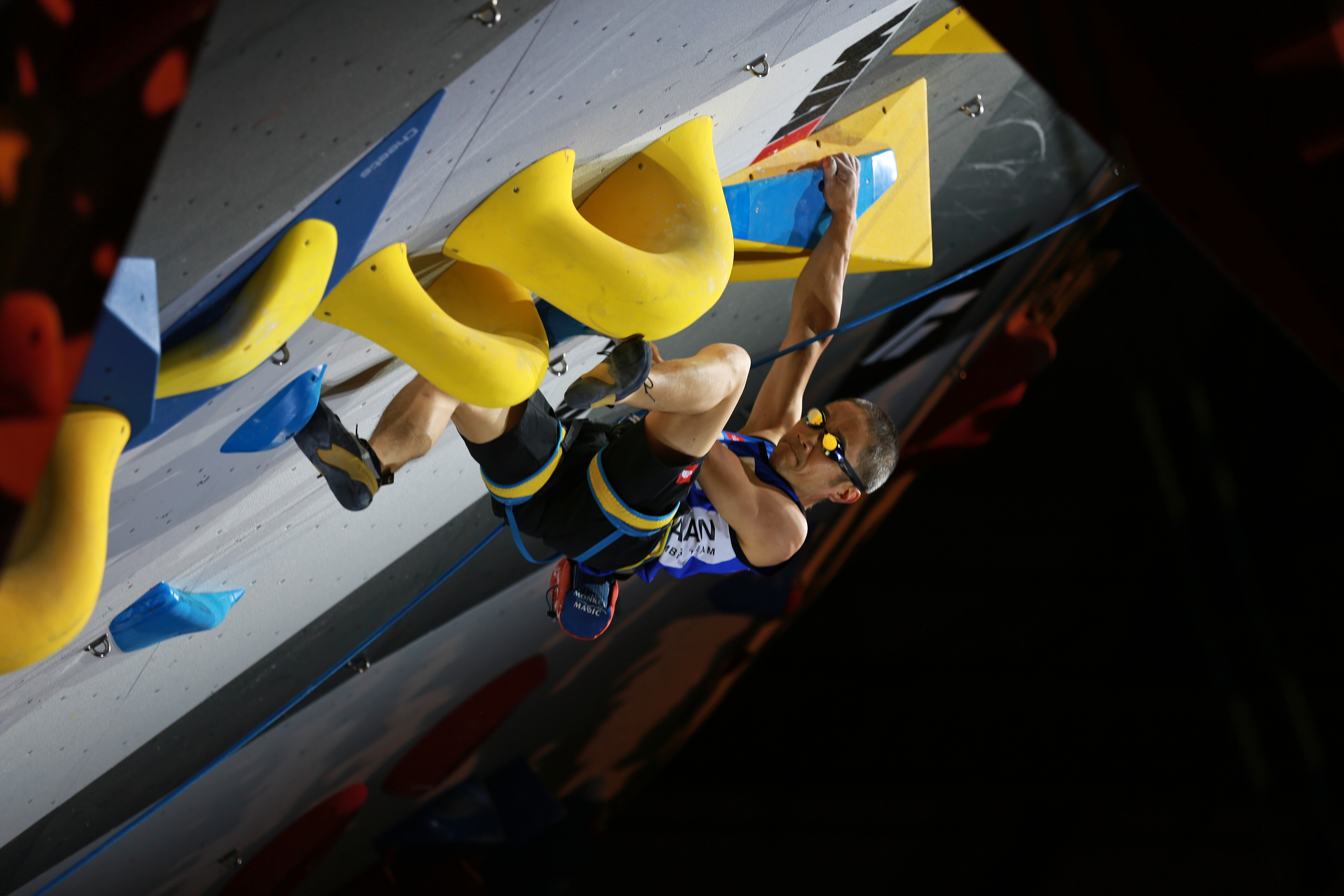
- A paraclimber competing in the B1 visual impairment category
- First played: 2006, Yekaterinburg, Russia

Characteristics
- Contact: No
- Team members: Individual
- Type: Parasports
- Equipment: Climbing harness, ropes, climbing shoes
- Venue: Indoor and outdoor climbing walls

Presence
- Paralympic: Los Angeles 2028 (first inclusion)

Para Climbing is competitive climbing for athletes with physical disabilities.

The classification system defines who is eligible to compete in paraclimbing and groups athletes with eligible impairments into sports classes. Athletes are placed into a sport class based on how their impairment affects their ability to carry out the fundamental activities in paraclimbing.

Sports classification for competitions differentiates paraclimbing from adaptive climbing in general.

== Participation and classification ==
Para Climbing includes multiple categories based on impairment type and functionality. World Climbing (formerly International Federation of Sport Climbing) governs classification rules, which are also used by USA Climbing (USAC), the governing body for Para Climbing in the United States.

Categories for competition include:

- Neurological/Physical Disability (RP1, RP2, RP3)
- Visual Impairment (B1, B2, B3)
- Upper Extremity Amputee (AU2, AU3)
- Lower Extremity Amputee (AL2)
- Seated (AL1)
- Youth (16 and under)
- Open (non-classified competition)

Athletes competing in World Climbing-sanctioned events must undergo classification to be placed in an official sport class. The USA Climbing Para Climbing classification system follows the World Climbing classification rules, which are updated annually.

== Competition formats ==
Para Climbing falls under the "lead" format, as opposed to "speed" or "boulder," but in Para Climbing "lead" is climbed on a toprope doubled-rope system, rather than a typical lead climb with clips and draws. Competitors are ranked based on the highest hold reached reached before falling. Competitors ascend the route until they fall, with no second attempts possible except in the case of a technical issue that disrupts the climb. If multiple athletes reach the same height, rankings are determined by previous round results or climbing time.

In USA Climbing Para Climbing Nationals, competition follows a two-round format:

- Day 1: Qualification round
- Day 2: Onsight final round

In USA Climbing events, competitors may choose to compete in official World Climbing-classified categories or in the Open category, which does not require classification. World Climbing events do not include an Open category.

== National and international competitions ==
USA Climbing National Championships

Each year, USA Climbing hosts the Para Climbing National Championships, which serves as the selection event for U.S. athletes aiming to compete internationally. To participate, climbers must have a USA Climbing Para Climbing Membership and be classified into an official category. Alternatively, athletes can compete in the Open category without classification.

World Climbing Para World Series and Para World Championships

The World Climbing Para Series is held annually, with events in Europe, North America, and Asia. Every two years, the World Climbing Para World Championships take place alongside the World Climbing Climbing World Championships.

Athletes who perform well at USA Climbing Para Climbing Nationals are eligible to become members of the USA National Team and represent USA Para Climbing at Para World Series events and Para World Championships.

== Paralympic inclusion ==
In January 2023, the International Paralympic Committee (IPC) shortlisted paraclimbing for the 2028 Summer Paralympics in Los Angeles. On June 13, 2024, the LA28 organizing committee officially selected paraclimbing for inclusion. This marked the sport’s debut at the Paralympics.

Not all sport classes were selected as medal events for 2028. The following sport classes will be allowed to participate in Los Angeles 2028

- Men's Lead Events
  - B1
  - RP1
  - AU2
  - AL2
- Women's Lead Events
  - B2
  - RP1
  - AU2
  - AL2

== History ==
The first international Para Climbing event was hosted by the International Federation of Sport Climbing in 2006 in Yekaterinburg, Russia. The sport grew, and a regular World Cup circuit was added to the IFSC calendar in 2010, being rebranded as World Climbing World Series in 2025. World Championships have taken place since 2011. The Para Climbing World Championships run alongside the Climbing World Championships, promoting para athletes on the same stage as other athletes.

In January 2017, the International Paralympic Committee (IPC) granted World Climbing (then still IFSC) the status of "Recognised International Federation".
