= University and college curling =

With the inclusion of curling into many FISU Universiades many countries have had to hold national championships to determine a representative.

== International University Sports Federation (FISU) ==
Curling at the Winter World University Games
| Year | Men's | | | Women's | | | Mixed doubles | | |
| Year | Gold | Silver | Bronze | Gold | Silver | Bronze | Gold | Silver | Bronze |
|---|---|---|---|---|---|---|---|---|---|
| 2003 | Canada | Switzerland | South Korea | Russia | Canada | Norway | Not held | | |
| 2007 | United States | Great Britain | Sweden | Canada | Russia | Japan | Not held | | |
| 2009 | Sweden | Norway | China | China | Canada | Russia | Not held | | |
| 2011 | South Korea | Switzerland | Czech Republic | Great Britain | Russia | South Korea | Not held | | |
| 2013 | Sweden | Great Britain | Canada | Russia | South Korea | Switzerland | Not held | | |
| 2015 | Norway | Russia | Great Britain | Russia | Canada | Switzerland | Not held | | |
| 2017 | Great Britain | Sweden | Norway | Canada | Russia | Sweden | Not held | | |
| 2019 | Norway | Canada | Great Britain | Sweden | South Korea | Russia | Not held | | |
| 2023 | Great Britain | United States | Canada | China | South Korea | United States | Not held | | |
| 2025 | Norway | United States | Switzerland | Japan | South Korea | Canada | Great Britain | Germany | South Korea |

== Canada ==
In Canada, University curling is played in a variety of levels. U Sports has sanctioned the University Curling Championships since 2008. The winners of the event will represent Canada at the FISU Universiades (in odd years).

=== Canadian Interuniversity Sport ===
==== 2006 Championships ====
Although this event was not fully sanctioned by the CIS or CCA, the winners still went on to represent Canada at the 2007 Winter Universiade. Men's champs were the Saskatchewan Huskies and the women were from the Calgary Dinos. The women's team went on to win Gold.

=== CIS/CCA Curling Championships ===
==== Ontario University Athletics ====
The OUA offers curling championships in Men's and Women's divisions.

- Algoma
- Brock
- Carleton
- Guelph
- Lakehead
- Laurentian
- Laurier
- McMaster
- Queen's
- Ryerson
- Toronto
- Trent
- UOIT
- Waterloo
- Western
- Windsor

=== Canadian Collegiate Athletic Association ===
The Canadian Collegiate Athletic Association (CCAA) began to hold national championships in 2012. Two of the CCAA's member conferences have a curling championship.

==== Alberta Colleges Athletic Conference ====
- Augustana Faculty University of Alberta
- Concordia University College of Alberta
- Grand Prairie Regional College
- Lakeland College
- MacEwan College
- Northern Alberta Institute of Technology (NAIT)
- Olds College
- Portage College
- Red Deer College

==== Ontario Colleges Athletic Association ====
- Algonquin College
- Confederation College
- Mohawk College
- Niagara College
- Seneca College
- Sir Sanford Flemming College
- Sir Sanford Flemming College (Lindsay)
- St. Clair College

== United States of America ==
Curling in the US is governed by College Curling USA.
