= Snowboarding at the 2025 Winter World University Games =

Snowboarding at the Torino 2025 FISU World University Games
- Snowboarding pictogram
- Venue: Snowpark Melezet Sellette & Campo Smith 1
- Dates: 12–22 January 2025

Snowboarding at the 2025 Winter World University Games was held at Snowpark Melezet Sellette & Campo Smith 1 from 12 to 22 January 2025.

== Men's events ==
Event	Gold		Silver		Bronze	
Parallel giant slalom	Tervel Zamfirov; Bulgaria		Ma Jun-ho; South Korea		Fabian Lantschner; Italy	
Parallel slalom	Matthäus Pink; Austria		Simon Dorfmann; Italy		Alexander Krashniak; Bulgaria	
Snowboard cross	Quentin Sodogas; France		Bernat Ribera; Spain		Umito Kirchwehm; Germany	
Slopestyle	Noé Petit; France	91.25	Thom Vogel; Netherlands	88.75	Liam Garandel; France	84.75
Big air	Ryoji Fujiya; Japan	96.00	Noé Petit; France	95.25	Moritz Breu; Germany	91.25

== Women's events ==
Event	Gold		Silver		Bronze	
Parallel giant slalom	Carmen Kainz; Austria		Elisa Fava; Italy		Noa Kanazawa; Japan	
Parallel slalom	Elisa Fava; Italy		Carmen Kainz; Austria		Martina Ankele; Austria	
Snowboard cross	Camille Poulat; France		Margaux Herpin; France		Marika Savoldelli; Italy	
Slopestyle	Tinkara Tanja Valcl; Slovenia	94.25	Amy McCarthy; Canada	78.75	Abril Casco; Argentina	42.25
Big air	Tinkara Tanja Valcl; Slovenia	89.50	Holly Smith; Great Britain	78.25	Amy McCarthy; Canada	71.75

== Medal table ==
* Host nation (Italy)

Rank	Nation	Gold	Silver	Bronze	Total
1	France	3	2	1	6
2	Austria	2	1	1	4
3	Slovenia	2	0	0	2
4	Italy*	1	2	2	5
5	Bulgaria	1	0	1	2
5	Japan	1	0	1	2
7	Canada	0	1	1	2
8	Great Britain	0	1	0	1
8	Netherlands	0	1	0	1
8	South Korea	0	1	0	1
8	Spain	0	1	0	1
12	Germany	0	0	2	2
13	Argentina	0	0	1	1
Totals (13 entries)		10	10	10	30

== Participating nations ==
- Argentina (1)
- Armenia (2)
- Australia (7)
- Austria (5)
- Bulgaria (2)
- Canada (6)
- China (8)
- Croatia (1)
- Czech Republic (8)
- Estonia (1)
- France (9)
- Germany (7)
- Great Britain (4)
- Hungary (3)
- Italy (10) (Hosts)
- Japan (16)
- Mongolia (1)
- Netherlands (2)
- Norway (1)
- Poland (8)
- Slovakia (2)
- Slovenia (2)
- South Korea (5)
- Spain (3)
- Turkey (8)
- Ukraine (7)
- United States (10)
