= Freestyle skiing at the 2025 Winter World University Games – Women's moguls =

Women’s moguls at the Torino 2025 FISU World University Games
- Freestyle skiing
- Venue: Bardonecchia
- Date: 14 January 2025
- Competitors: 17 from 8 nations
- Winning time: 79.79

Medalists
1st place, gold medalist(s)		Anastassiya Gorodko	Kazakhstan
2nd place, silver medalist(s)		Haruka Nakao	Japan
3rd place, bronze medalist(s)		Hanna Weese	Germany

The women’s moguls competition of the 2025 Winter World University Games will be held on 14 January 2025.

== Results ==
=== Qualification ===
Qualification was started at 11:00.

Rank	Order	Bib	Name	Country	Time	Score			Total	Notes
Rank	Order	Bib	Name	Country	Time	Turns	Air	Time	Total	Notes
1	14	1	Anastassiya Gorodko	Kazakhstan	25.41	45.4	14.24	17.11	76.75	Q
2	3	10	Ayaulym Amrenova	Kazakhstan	27.25	44.1	12.72	14.88	71.70	Q
3	12	2	Haruka Nakao	Japan	28.79	43.3	13.62	13.01	69.93	Q
4	15	3	Yuma Taguchi	Japan	28.19	42.1	11.57	13.73	67.40	Q
5	8	7	Marie Duaux	France	28.63	42.2	11.55	13.20	66.95	Q
6	6	5	Fantine Degroote	France	28.06	40.2	12.66	13.89	66.75	Q
7	17	15	Annika Merz	Germany	27.67	41.6	10.39	14.37	66.36	Q
8	16	6	Hanna Weese	Germany	26.77	40.5	9.01	15.46	64.97	Q
9	5	11	Zoe Dwinell	United States	28.79	40.6	11.24	13.01	64.85	Q
10	9	16	Elis Lundholm	Sweden	26.80	39.6	9.41	15.42	64.43	Q
11	2	4	Marin Ito	Japan	27.83	38.3	11.85	14.17	64.32	Q
12	4	12	Moa Gustafson	Sweden	27.58	40.8	8.69	14.48	63.97	Q
13	7	14	August Davis	United States	28.21	37.4	11.04	13.71	62.15	
14	13	13	Skylar Slettene	United States	28.84	39.7	9.46	12.94	62.10	
15	10	9	Emma Bosco	Australia	27.57	35.8	11.41	14.49	61.70	
16	11	8	Sami Worthington	United States	29.93	28.4	11.26	11.62	51.28	
	1	17	Riikka Voutilainen	Finland	DNS					

=== Final 1 ===
Rank	Order	Bib	Name	Country	Time	Score			Total	Notes
Rank	Order	Bib	Name	Country	Time	Turns	Air	Time	Total	Notes
1	12	1	Anastassiya Gorodko	Kazakhstan	25.88	46.1	14.55	16.54	77.19	Q
2	10	2	Haruka Nakao	Japan	27.90	44.4	14.84	14.09	73.33	Q
3	5	6	Hanna Weese	Germany	26.62	43.2	13.37	15.64	72.21	Q
4	11	10	Ayaulym Amrenova	Kazakhstan	27.31	43.8	12.56	14.80	71.16	Q
5	6	15	Annika Merz	Germany	27.10	43.1	12.14	15.06	70.30	Q
6	8	7	Marie Duaux	France	27.97	43.5	12.77	14.00	70.27	Q
7	9	3	Yuma Taguchi	Japan	27.81	44.4	11.31	14.20	69.91	
8	1	12	Moa Gustafson	Sweden	26.61	42.6	11.11	15.65	69.36	
9	4	11	Zoe Dwinell	United States	28.25	43.1	11.36	13.66	68.12	
10	3	16	Elis Lundholm	Sweden	26.84	41.8	10.93	15.38	68.11	
11	2	4	Marin Ito	Japan	27.27	40.4	12.43	14.85	67.68	
12	7	5	Fantine Degroote	France	27.52	40.5	10.13	14.55	65.18	

=== Final 2 ===
Rank	Order	Bib	Name	Country	Time	Score			Total	Notes
Rank	Order	Bib	Name	Country	Time	Turns	Air	Time	Total	Notes
1st place, gold medalist(s)	6	1	Anastassiya Gorodko	Kazakhstan	25.77	47.8	15.31	16.68	79.79	
2nd place, silver medalist(s)	5	2	Haruka Nakao	Japan	27.11	46.4	14.84	15.05	76.29	
3rd place, bronze medalist(s)	4	6	Hanna Weese	Germany	25.78	45.1	13.28	16.66	75.04	
4	2	15	Annika Merz	Germany	25.75	43.0	12.54	16.70	72.24	
5	3	10	Ayaulym Amrenova	Kazakhstan	26.49	41.9	12.82	15.80	70.52	
6	1	7	Marie Duaux	France	27.22	42.6	11.69	14.91	69.20	
