= Netherlands at the 2025 Winter World University Games =

- IOC code: NED
- NOC: Studentensport Nederland

in Turin, Italy 13 January 2025 – 23 January 2025
- Competitors: 20 (13 men and 7 women) in 7 sports
- Medals Ranked 24th: Gold 0 Silver 1 Bronze 0 Total 1

Winter Universiade appearances
- 1960; 1962; 1964; 1966; 1968; 1972; 1978; 1981; 1983; 1985; 1987; 1989; 1991; 1993; 1995; 1997; 1999; 2001; 2003; 2005; 2007; 2009; 2011; 2013; 2015; 2017; 2019; 2023; 2025

Netherlands competed at the 2025 Winter World University Games in Turin, Italy, from 13 to 23 January 2025.

== Medalists ==
Netherlands finished on the twenty-fourth place in the medal table with one medal.

Medal	Name	Sport	Event	Date
Silver	Thom Vogel	Snowboarding	Men's dnowboard slopestyle	17 January

== Competitors ==
At the 2025 Winter World University Games was participated 19 athletes.

Sport	Men	Women	Total
Alpine skiing	2	2	4
Biathlon	2	0	2
Cross-country skiing	1	0	1
Figure skating	0	1	1
Short track speed skating	5	4	9
Ski mountaineering	1	0	1
Snowboarding	2	0	2
Total	13	7	20
