= Spain at the 2025 Winter World University Games =

- IOC code: ESP
- NOC: Spanish University Sport Committee

in Turin, Italy 13 January 2025 – 23 January 2025
- Competitors: 31 in 7 sports
- Flag bearers: Sofía Val, Iker Oyarzabal
- Medals Ranked 7th: Gold 4 Silver 7 Bronze 2 Total 13

Winter Universiade appearances
- 1960; 1962; 1964; 1966; 1968; 1972; 1978; 1981; 1983; 1985; 1987; 1989; 1991; 1993; 1995; 1997; 1999; 2001; 2003; 2005; 2007; 2009; 2011; 2013; 2015; 2017; 2019; 2023; 2025

Spain competed at the 2025 Winter World University Games in Turin, Italy, from 13 to 23 January 2025.

== Medalists ==
Spain finished on the seventh place in the medal table with 13 medals.

| Medal | Name | Sport | Event | Date |
|---|---|---|---|---|
| Gold | Audrey Pascual | Para-alpine skiing | Women's super-g sitting | 16 January |
| Gold | Ander Mintegui | Alpine skiing | Men's super-g | 17 January |
| Gold | Sofía Val; Asaf Kazimov | Figure skating | Ice dance | 17 January |
| Gold | Aleix Aubert | Alpine skiing | Men's giant slalom | 19 January |
| Silver | Bernat Ribera | Snowboarding | Men's snowboard cross | 14 January |
| Silver | María Martín-Granizo | Para-alpine skiing | Women's super-g standing | 16 January |
| Silver | María Ordoñez | Ski mountaineering | Women's sprint | 16 January |
| Silver | Maria Ordoñez; Marc Ràdua | Ski mountaineering | Mixed relay | 17 January |
| Silver | Audrey Pascual | Para-alpine skiing | Women's giant slalom sitting | 18 January |
| Silver | María Martín-Granizo | Para-alpine skiing | Women's giant slalom standing | 18 January |
| Silver | María Ordoñez | Ski mountaineering | Women's vertical race | 19 January |
| Bronze | Tomás Barata | Alpine skiing | Men's alpine combined | 16 January |
| Bronze | Ares Torra | Ski mountaineering | Women's sprint | 16 January |

== Competitors ==
At the 2025 Winter World University Games was participated 31 athletes. Sofía Val and Iker Oyarzabal was a flag bearers.

| Sport | Men | Women | Total |
|---|---|---|---|
| Alpine skiing | 4 | 4 | 8 |
| Biathlon | 1 | 1 | 2 |
| Cross-country skiing | 2 | 0 | 2 |
| Figure skating | 4 | 4 | 8 |
| Para-alpine skiing | 0 | 2 | 2 |
| Ski mountaineering | 4 | 2 | 6 |
| Snowboarding | 2 | 1 | 3 |
| Total | 17 | 14 | 31 |
