= Eri Ogihara =

Japanese curler

- Curler
- Born: Eri Ogihara; February 12, 2003 (age 23); Japan

Team
- Curling club: GRANDIR

Curling career
- Member Association: Japan
- Other appearances: World University Games: 1 (2025), World Junior Championships: 3 (2020, 2022, 2023), World Junior-B Championships: 1 (2019 (Dec))
Medal record
Women's curling
Representing Japan
World University Games
| Gold medal – first place | 2025 Turin |
World Junior Championships
| Gold medal – first place | 2022 Jönköping |
| Silver medal – second place | 2023 Füssen |

Eri Ogihara (荻原 詠理, Ogihara Eri; born February 12, 2003) is a Japanese female curler from Karuizawa.

== Career ==
At the age of 10, Ogihara began competitively curling, joining Ikue Kitazawa's junior team where they played in the 2014 Japan Women's Curling Championship. Ogihara then returned to the national women's championship in 2017, as lead for the Misato Yanagisawa rink. Ogihara found success in 2019 and started representing Japan at the world level, playing third for the Sae Yamamoto rink, where they won the 2019 World Junior-B Curling Championships (Dec), qualifying themselves for the 2020 World Junior Curling Championships, where they finished 4th. After the World Juniors was cancelled in 2021, the Yamamoto rink returned to the 2022 World Junior Curling Championships, where they won the gold medal, beating Sweden's Moa Dryburgh 7–4 in the final, winning Japan's first-ever World Junior Championship. Ogihara would return to the World Juniors in 2023, with the newly formed Yuina Miura rink, where they finished in second, losing to Scotland's Fay Henderson 9–7 in the final.

While going their separate ways after graduating to Women's play, Ogihara would join forces with Yuina Miura again in 2025, representing Japan as part of the team from Sapporo International University at the 2025 Winter World University Games. They won Japan's first gold medal in curling at the World University Games, beating South Korea's Kang Bo-bae rink 7–5 in the final.

== Personal life ==
Ogihara attended Rikkyo University.

== Teams ==
| Season | Skip | Third | Second | Lead | Alternate | Coach | Events |
|---|---|---|---|---|---|---|---|
| 2013–14 | Ikue Kitazawa | Seina Nakajima | Minori Suzuki | Eri Ogihara | Ayako Tanimoto | | JWCC 2014 (8th) |
| 2016–17 | Misato Yanagisawa | Riko Toyoda | Mayu Sugahara | Eri Ogihara | Chinami Okamura | | JWCC 2017 (5th) |
| 2018–19 | Yumi Toda | Eri Ogihara | Sakura Asano | Rito Suyama | | | |
| 2019–20 | Minori Suzuki (Fourth) | Eri Ogihara | Yui Ueno | Sae Yamamoto (Skip) | Miyu Ueno | Mitsuki Sato | WJBCC 2019 (Dec) (gold); WJCC 2020 (4th) |
| 2021–22 | Miyu Ueno (Fourth) | Eri Ogihara | Yui Ueno | Sae Yamamoto (Skip) | Yuina Miura | Ayumi Ogasawara | WJCC 2022 (gold) |
| 2022–23 | Yuina Miura | Eri Ogihara | Yui Ueno | Yuuna Sakuma | Ai Matsunaga | | WJCC 2023 (silver) |
| 2024–25 | Eri Ogihara (Fourth); Yuina Miura | Honoka Sasaki (Skip); Kohane Tsuruga | Miki Hayashi; Eri Ogihara | Yako Matsuzawa; Rin Suzuki | Ai Matsunaga | Ayumi Ogasawara | 2025 WUG (gold) |
