= Finn Hösch =

German ski mountaineer (born 2003)

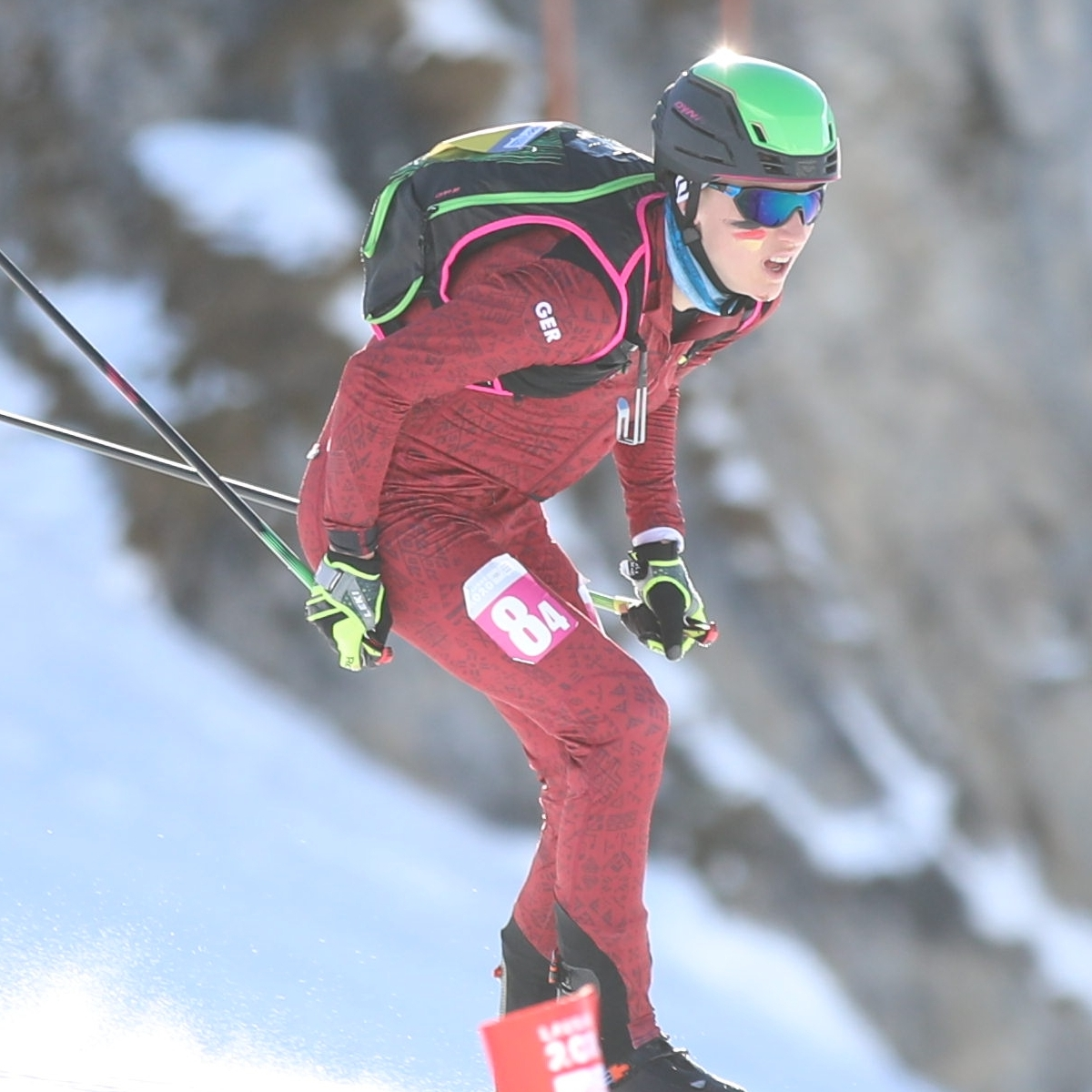
- Hösch at the 2020 Winter Youth Olympics

Personal information
- Born: 21 January 2003 (age 23) Munich, Germany
- Height: 1.83 m (6 ft 0 in)
- Weight: 62 kg (137 lb)

Sport
- Country: Germany
- Sport: Ski mountaineering
Medal record
Men's ski mountaineering
Representing Germany
World University Games
Gold medal – first place	2025 Turin	Sprint race
Bronze medal – third place	2025 Turin	Mixed relay

Finn Hösch (born 21 January 2003) is a German ski mountaineer. He will represent Germany at the 2026 Winter Olympics.

== Career ==
Hösch represented Germany at the 2020 Winter Youth Olympics in ski mountaineering, an event making its Youth Olympics debut. His best finish was fifth place in the mixed relay.

In January 2025, he competed at the 2025 Winter World University Games in ski mountaineering, an event making its debut at the FISU World University Games. He won a gold medal in the sprint race with a time 3:59.90. He also won a bronze medal in the mixed relay, with a time of 45:58.36.

In January 2026, he was selected to represent Germany at the 2026 Winter Olympics.
