= Dalmasso =

Dalmasso is an Italian surname. Notable people with the surname include:

- Lucia Dalmasso (born 1997), Italian snowboarder
- Pablo Giner Dalmasso (born 2001), French ski mountaineer
