= Pablo Giner Dalmasso =

French ski mountaineer (born 2001)

Personal information
- Born: 1 June 2001 (age 25) Vénissieux, France
- Height: 1.73 m (5 ft 8 in)
- Weight: 57 kg (126 lb)

Sport
- Country: France
- Sport: Ski mountaineering
- Club: Team Isère Montagne
Medal record
Men's ski mountaineering
Representing France
World University Games
Gold medal – first place	2025 Turin	Mixed relay
Silver medal – second place	2025 Turin	Sprint race
French championships
Gold medal – first place	2020 Alpe d'Huez	Vertical Race
Gold medal – first place	2022 Les Sybelles	Relay
Gold medal – first place	2026 Chamrousse	Mixed relay
Silver medal – second place	2022 Courchevel	Vertical race

Pablo Giner Dalmasso (born 1 June 2001) is a French ski mountaineer, specializes in sprint and mixed relay events.

== Career ==
Pablo Giner Dalmasso began his sporting career in Nordic skiing with Le Bessat Sports d'Hiver and orienteering with Orient'Express 42. Aged 16 years, he turned to ski mountaineering, attracted by the combination of intense physical effort and technical mountain skills.

A member of the Team Isère Montagne, Giner Dalmasso competes in major international ski mountaineering events, and is also a member of the French national team.

On the ISMF Ski Mountaineering World Cup circuit, he achieved notable results in mixed relay, earning several podium finishes alongside Emily Harrop, including a second place in Arinsal (Andorra) and a third place in Val Martello (Italy) during the 2024–25 ISMF Ski Mountaineering World Cup. These performances reflect his growing importance within international team events.

In individual competitions, he regularly ranks among the leading athletes, with several strong performances in World Cup races. During the 2025 Winter World University Games in Sestrière (Italy), Giner Dalmasso won a silver medal in ski mountaineering events and contributed to a relay podium for the French team, successfully combining high-level sporting results with his academic career. At the national level, he consistently finishes among the top competitors in French events, taking part in the French Cup circuit and national championships.

Following the Ski Mountaineering World Cup round in Courchevel, the French team once again confirmed its status among the world's leading nations in the discipline. Competing on home snow, Giner Dalmasso delivered a strong performance in the men's sprint event, reaching the semi-finals before being eliminated. He was selected for the Olympic qualification events for the Milan–Cortina 2026 Winter Olympics, and represent France alongside Thibault Anselmet in the men's events, while Emily Harrop and Margot Ravinel form the women's selection.
