= China at the 2025 Winter World University Games =

- IOC code: CHN
- NOC: Federation of Chinese University and School Sports

in Turin, Italy 13 January 2025 – 23 January 2025
- Competitors: 46 (23 men and 23 women) in 6 sports
- Flag bearers: Pei Junhang (curling); Liu Xiangqi (alpine skiing)
- Medals Ranked 16th: Gold 1 Silver 3 Bronze 1 Total 5

Winter Universiade appearances (overview)
- 1960; 1962; 1964; 1966; 1968; 1972; 1978; 1981; 1983; 1985; 1987; 1989; 1991; 1993; 1995; 1997; 1999; 2001; 2003; 2005; 2007; 2009; 2011; 2013; 2015; 2017; 2019; 2023; 2025

China competed at the 2025 Winter World University Games in Turin, Italy, from 13 to 23 January 2025.

== Medalists ==
China finished on the sixteenth place in the medal table with five medals.

Medal	Name	Sport	Event	Date
Gold	Liu Guanyi; Song Guixu; Li Kun; Zhang Tianyi; Zhu Yiding	Short track speed skating	Men's 5000m relay	23 January
Silver	Hao Weiying	Short track speed skating	Women's 500m	22 January
Silver	Zhang Yan; Liu Guanyi; Hao Weiying; Li Kun; Lyu Wanyu; Song Guixu	Short track speed skating	Mixed team relay	22 January
Silver	Xing Ailin; Zhang Yan; Song Yifei; Hao Weiying; Lyu Wanyu	Short track speed skating	Women's 3000m relay	23 January
Bronze	Hao Weiying	Short track speed skating	Women's 1000m	23 January

== Competitors ==
At the 2025 Winter World University Games was participated 46 athletes. Pei Junhang (curling) and Liu Xiangqi (alpine skiing) were a flag bearers at the opening ceremony.

Sport	Men	Women	Total
Alpine skiing	4	4	8
Cross-country skiing	4	4	8
Curling	5	5	10
Short track speed skating	5	5	10
Ski mountaineering	1	1	2
Snowboarding	4	4	8
Total	23	23	46
