= Luxembourg at the 2025 Winter World University Games =

- IOC code: LUX
- NOC: Ligue des Associations Sportives Estudiantines Luxembourgeoises

in Turin, Italy 13 January 2025 – 23 January 2025
- Competitors: 3 (2 men and 1 woman) in 2 sports
- Medals: Gold 0 Silver 0 Bronze 0 Total 0

Winter Universiade appearances
- 1960; 1962; 1964; 1966; 1968; 1972; 1978; 1981; 1983; 1985; 1987; 1989; 1991; 1993; 1995; 1997; 1999; 2001; 2003; 2005; 2007; 2009; 2011; 2013; 2015; 2017; 2019; 2023; 2025

Luxembourg competed at the 2025 Winter World University Games in Turin, Italy, from 13 to 23 January 2025.

== Competitors ==
At the 2025 Winter World University Games was participated 3 athletes: Joachim Keghian, Joyce ten Raa and Peter Murphy

Sport	Men	Women	Total
Alpine skiing	1	1	2
Short track speed skating	1	0	1
Total	2	1	3
