= Lithuania at the 2025 Winter World University Games =

- IOC code: LTU
- NOC: Lietuvos studentų sporto asociacija
- Website: lssa.lt

in Turin, Italy 13 January 2025 – 23 January 2025
- Competitors: 4 in 3 sports
- Medals: Gold 0 Silver 0 Bronze 0 Total 0

Winter Universiade appearances
- 1960; 1962; 1964; 1966; 1968; 1972; 1978; 1981; 1983; 1985; 1987; 1989; 1991; 1993; 1995; 1997; 1999; 2001; 2003; 2005; 2007; 2009; 2011; 2013; 2015; 2017; 2019; 2023; 2025

Lithuania competed at the 2025 Winter World University Games in Turin, Italy, from 13 to 23 January 2025.

== Competitors ==
At the 2025 Winter World University Games was participated 4 athletes.

Sport	Men	Women	Total
Figure skating	0	1	1
Freestyle skiing	0	1	1
Ski orienteering	1	1	2
Total	1	3	4

Athlete	Date of birth	Sport	University	Sex
Jogailė Aglinskytė	16 November 2005	Figure skating	Vytautas Magnus University	F
Algirdas Dienys	16 January 2006	Ski orienteering	Vilnius University	M
Medeinė Povilavičiūtė	25 December 2005	Freestyle skiing	Lithuanian Sports University	F
Emilija Tamoševičiūtė	13 May 2003	Ski orienteering	Vilnius University	F
