= Austria at the 2025 Winter World University Games =

- IOC code: AUT
- NOC: Unisport Austria

in Turin, Italy 13 January 2025 – 23 January 2025
- Competitors: 24 (11 men and 13 women) in 8 sports
- Flag bearer: Isabel Hofherr (freestyle skiing)
- Medals Ranked 15th: Gold 2 Silver 2 Bronze 2 Total 6

Winter Universiade appearances
- 1960; 1962; 1964; 1966; 1968; 1972; 1978; 1981; 1983; 1985; 1987; 1989; 1991; 1993; 1995; 1997; 1999; 2001; 2003; 2005; 2007; 2009; 2011; 2013; 2015; 2017; 2019; 2023; 2025

Austria competed at the 2025 Winter World University Games in Turin, Italy, from 13 to 23 January 2025.

== Medalists ==
Austria finished on the fifteenth place in the medal table with six medals.

| Medal | Name | Sport | Event | Date |
|---|---|---|---|---|
| Gold | Carmen Kainz | Snowboarding | Women's parallel giant slalom | 21 January |
| Gold | Matthäus Pink | Snowboarding | Men's parallel slalom | 22 January |
| Silver | Isabel Hofherr | Freestyle skiing | Women's ski cross | 22 January |
| Silver | Carmen Kainz | Snowboarding | Women's parallel slalom | 22 January |
| Bronze | Laura Streng | Para-alpine skiing | Women's giant slalom standing | 18 January |
| Bronze | Martina Ankele | Snowboarding | Women's parallel slalom | 22 January |

== Competitors ==
At the 2025 Winter World University Games was participated 24 athletes. Isabel Hofherr was a flag bearer at the opening ceremony.

| Sport | Men | Women | Total |
|---|---|---|---|
| Alpine skiing | 6 | 5 | 11 |
| Cross-country skiing | 1 | 2 | 3 |
| Freestyle skiing | 0 | 1 | 1 |
| Para-alpine skiing | 0 | 1 | 1 |
| Ski mountaineering | 0 | 2 | 2 |
| Ski orienteering | 1 | 1 | 2 |
| Snowboarding | 3 | 2 | 5 |
| Total | 11 | 14 | 25 |
