= Lithuania at the 2011 Winter Universiade =

- IOC code: LTU

in Erzurum
- Competitors: 3 in 2 sports
- Medals: Gold 0 Silver 0 Bronze 0 Total 0

Winter Universiade appearances
- 1960; 1962; 1964; 1966; 1968; 1972; 1978; 1981; 1983; 1985; 1987; 1989; 1991; 1993; 1995; 1997; 1999; 2001; 2003; 2005; 2007; 2009; 2011; 2013; 2015; 2017; 2019; 2023; 2025

Lithuania competed at the 2011 Winter Universiade in Erzurum, Turkey.

== Biathlon ==
Women

Athlete	Event	Final		
Athlete	Event	Time	Misses	Rank
Aliona Sosunova	Women's individual	58:39.2	2+2+1+2	27th
Aliona Sosunova	Women's sprint	27:39.7	1+1+2	22nd
Aliona Sosunova	Women's pursuit	40:44.0	1+0+2+0	21st
Aliona Sosunova	Women's mass start	46:26.4	2+1+0+1	15th

== Figure skating ==
Athlete(s)	Event	SP/SP		FS/LP		Total	
Athlete(s)	Event	Points	Rank	Points	Rank	Points	Rank
Saulius Ambrulevičius	Men's	36.35	27th	78.07	25th	114.42	26th
Aida Rybalko	Ladies'	19.26	30th	54.95	26th	74.21	27th
