= Ski orienteering at the 2025 Winter World University Games =

Ski orienteering at the Torino 2025 FISU World University Games
- Ski orienteering pictogram
- Venue: Pragelato Plan
- Dates: 19–21 January 2025

Ski orienteering at the 2025 Winter World University Games was held at Pragelato Plan from 19 to 21 January 2025, making its return after absent during the 2023 Winter Games.

== Events ==
Event	Gold		Silver		Bronze	
Men's sprint	Teodor Mo Hjelseth; Norway	12:52	Jonatan Ståhl; Sweden	12:54	Josef Nagy; Czech Republic	13:03
Women's sprint	Amanda Yli-Futka; Finland	12:39	Idunn Strand; Norway	13:15	Delia Giezendanner; Switzerland	13:22
Mixed relay	Finland 1 Amanda Yli-Futka; Niklas Ekström	45:10	Sweden 1 Anna Aasa; Jonatan Ståhl	45:19	Switzerland 1 Delia Giezendanner; Corsin Boos	45:28

== Medal table ==
* Host nation (Italy)

Rank	Nation	Gold	Silver	Bronze	Total
1	Finland	2	0	0	2
2	Norway	1	1	0	2
3	Sweden	0	2	0	2
4	Switzerland	0	0	2	2
5	Czech Republic	0	0	1	1
Totals (5 entries)		3	3	3	9

== Participating nations ==
- Austria (2)
- Czech Republic (2)
- Estonia (2)
- Finland (7)
- Germany (3)
- Italy (3) (Hosts)
- Japan (2)
- Kazakhstan (10)
- Latvia (4)
- Lithuania (2)
- Norway (11)
- Switzerland (3)
- Slovakia (3)
- Sweden (4)
