= María Martín-Granizo =

Spanish para-alpine skier (born 2006)

Personal information
- Full name: María Martín-Granizo Ferreiro
- Born: 29 March 2006 (age 20)

Sport
- Country: Spain
- Sport: Para-alpine skiing
- Disability: Agenesis
- Disability class: LW2
Medal record
Representing Spain
Women's para-alpine skiing
World University Games
Silver medal – second place	2025 Turin	Super-G standing
Silver medal – second place	2025 Turin	Giant slalom standing
Women's para surfing
World Championships
Gold medal – first place	2022 Pismo Beach	Stand 3
Silver medal – second place	2023 Huntington Beach	Stand 3

María Martín-Granizo Ferreiro (born 29 March 2006) is a Spanish para-alpine skier and para surfer.

== Career ==
Martín-Granizo competed at the 2022 World Para Surfing Championships and won a gold medal in the stand 3 event. She again competed at the 2023 World Para Surfing Championships and won a silver medal in the stand 3 event.

In January 2025, she competed at the 2025 Winter World University Games in para-alpine skiing and won silver medals in the Super-G and giant slalom standing events.

In February 2026, she was selected to represent Spain at the 2026 Winter Paralympics.

== Personal life ==
Martín-Granizo was born with femoral agenesis.
