= Argentina at the 2025 Winter World University Games =

- IOC code: ARG
- NOC: Federación del Deporte Universitario Argentino

in Turin, Italy 13 January 2025 – 23 January 2025
- Competitors: 4 (2 men and 2 women) in 4 sports
- Medals Ranked 26th: Gold 0 Silver 0 Bronze 1 Total 1

Winter Universiade appearances (overview)
- 2007; 2009; 2011; 2013; 2015; 2017; 2019; 2023; 2025

Argentina competed at the 2025 Winter World University Games in Turin, Italy, from 13 to 23 January 2025.

== Medalists ==
Argentina finished on the twenty-sixth place in the medal table with one medal. It was the first medal for Argentina at the Winter World University Games.

Medal	Name	Sport	Event	Date
Bronze	Abril Casco	Snowboarding	Women's snowboard slopestyle	17 January

== Competitors ==
At the 2025 Winter World University Games was participated 4 athletes.

Sport	Men	Women	Total
Alpine skiing	1	0	1
Cross-country skiing	1	0	1
Figure skating	0	1	1
Snowboarding	0	1	1
Total	2	2	4

== Alpine skiing ==
Athlete	Event	Run 1		Run 2		Total	
Athlete	Event	Time	Rank	Time	Rank	Time	Rank
Felipe Eiras	Men's alpine combined	1:01.12	32	42.62	21	1:43.74	28
Felipe Eiras	Men's giant slalom	1:03.07	30	1:04.04	29	2:07.11	29
Felipe Eiras	Men's slalom	DNF					
Felipe Eiras	Men's super-G	—N/a				1:00.11	26

== Cross-country skiing ==
Distance

Athlete	Event	Final		
Athlete	Event	Time	Deficit	Rank
Franco Dal Farra	Men's 10 km freestyle	25:31.5	+1:10.5	23
Franco Dal Farra	Men's 20 km classical	1:04:13.3	+8:04.6	44

Sprint

Athlete	Event	Qualification		Quarterfinal		Semifinal		Final	
Athlete	Event	Time	Rank	Time	Rank	Time	Rank	Time	Rank
Franco Dal Farra	Men's sprint	3:18.95	58	Did not advance					

== Figure skating ==
Athlete	Event	SP/SD		FP/FD		Total	
Athlete	Event	Points	Rank	Points	Rank	Points	Rank
Michelle Di Cicco	Women's singles	23.75	33	Did not advance			

== Snowboarding ==
Park & Pipe

Athlete	Event	Qualification					Final		
Athlete	Event	Run 1	Run 2	Best	Rank	Run 1	Run 2	Best	Rank
Abril Luz Casco	Women's big air	45.00	DNI	45.00	3 Q	23.25	DNI	23.25	4
Abril Luz Casco	Women's slopestyle	20.50	DNI	20.50	3 Q	42.25	DNI	42.25	3rd place, bronze medalist(s)
