= Hungary at the 2025 Winter World University Games =

- IOC code: HUN
- NOC: Hungarian University Sports Federation

in Turin, Italy 13 January 2025 – 23 January 2025
- Competitors: 18 (9 men and 9 women) in 4 sports
- Flag bearer: Regina Schermann (figure skating)
- Medals: Gold 0 Silver 0 Bronze 0 Total 0

Winter Universiade appearances
- 1960; 1962; 1964; 1966; 1968; 1972; 1978; 1981; 1983; 1985; 1987; 1989; 1991; 1993; 1995; 1997; 1999; 2001; 2003; 2005; 2007; 2009; 2011; 2013; 2015; 2017; 2019; 2023; 2025

Hungary competed at the 2025 Winter World University Games in Turin, Italy, from 13 to 23 January 2025.

== Competitors ==
At the 2025 Winter World University Games was participated 18 athletes. Regina Schermann (figure skating) was a flag bearer at the opening ceremony.

Sport	Men	Women	Total
Alpine skiing	2	4	6
Figure skating	2	2	4
Short track speed skating	2	3	5
Snowboarding	3	0	3
Total	9	9	18
