= Slovenia at the 2025 Winter World University Games =

- IOC code: SLO
- NOC: Slovenian University Sports Association

in Turin, Italy 13 January 2025 – 23 January 2025
- Competitors: 18 (9 men and 9 women) in 8 sports
- Medals Ranked 11th: Gold 4 Silver 1 Bronze 1 Total 6

Winter Universiade appearances
- 1960; 1962; 1964; 1966; 1968; 1972; 1978; 1981; 1983; 1985; 1987; 1989; 1991; 1993; 1995; 1997; 1999; 2001; 2003; 2005; 2007; 2009; 2011; 2013; 2015; 2017; 2019; 2023; 2025

Slovenia competed at the 2025 Winter World University Games in Turin, Italy, from 13 to 23 January 2025.

== Medalists ==
Slovenia finished on the eleventh place in the medal table with six medals.

Medal	Name	Sport	Event	Date
Gold	Tinkara Valcl	Snowboarding	Women's snowboard slopestyle	17 January
Gold	Jernej Slivnik	Para-alpine skiing	Men's giant slalom sitting	18 January
Gold	Klemen Vidmar	Freestyle skiing	Men's freeski big air	19 January
Gold	Tinkara Valcl	Snowboarding	Women's snowboard big air	19 January
Silver	Jernej Slivnik	Para-alpine skiing	Men's super-g sitting	16 January
Bronze	Klemen Vidmar	Freestyle skiing	Men's freeski slopestyle	17 January

== Competitors ==
At the 2025 Winter World University Games was participated 18 athletes.

Sport	Men	Women	Total
Alpine skiing	2	5	7
Cross-country skiing	2	2	4
Figure skating	1	0	1
Freestyle skiing	1	0	1
Para-alpine skiing	1	0	1
Para-cross-country skiing	0	1	1
Short-track speed skating	1	0	1
Snowboarding	1	1	2
Total	9	9	18
