= University of Nebraska Curling Guild =

University of Nebraska–Lincoln curling club team

Nebraska Cornhuskers
- Founded: 2007; 18 years ago
- University: University of Nebraska–Lincoln
- Athletic director: Troy Dannen
- Conference: Aksarben Curling Club
- Location: Lincoln, Nebraska
- Home arena: Baxter Arena
- Nickname: Cornhuskers
- Colors: Scarlet and cream

The University of Nebraska Curling Club is the collegiate curling club team that represents the University of Nebraska–Lincoln. The team has competed in the Aksarben Curling Club since it was established in 2007 and primarily plays at Baxter Arena.

== History ==
=== Club formation and growth (2007–2012) ===
The Nebraska Curling Club began its history as the University of Nebraska Curling Guild in 2007. The club branched off of the Aksarben Curling Club in October 2007, eventually being established as an official club sport at NU. The team began competition in January 2008, joining the Aksarben Curling Club League and finishing third in the year-end College Curling Championship bonspiel in Chicago. NU played its first full season the following year, again participating in the College Curling Championship, and fielded two teams in 2010 after an increase in membership.

Nebraska began competing in additional bonspiels in 2011, a transition year for collegiate curling – the national championship in Chicago was canceled in favor of regional events, as College Curling USA had yet to establish a national event. NU finished second in the Division III Midwest Regional Championship in Hartland, Wisconsin.

=== USA Curling College Championship era (2012–present) ===
The USA Curling College Championship was created in 2012 and established a true national championship event for collegiate curling. The event eliminated experience-based divisional tiers, leaving teams across all levels to qualify by accumulating merit points during the season. Nebraska was placed in Region 5 – it was designated an "emerging region" due to the lack of relative competition in the area, allowing for merit points to be earned in community leagues and extracurricular bonspiels. Nebraska competed in four collegiate bonspiels in addition to league play in the 2012–13 season, finishing runner-up to Tennessee in Region 5. The team was swept in the round robin segment of the inaugural USA Curling College Championship in Duluth. Nebraska again finished runner-up to Tennessee in Region 5 and participated in the national championship.

Following the 2014 season, the club updated its name from the University of Nebraska Curling Guild to the University of Nebraska Curling Club. The 2014 Winter Olympic Games put a spotlight on curling as a sport, and a growth in membership allowed NU to add a third team to its regular-season competition in the Aksarben Curling Club. Nebraska hosted and won the Big Red Bonspiel at Ralston Arena in Omaha, the first time the Nebraska Curling club hosted its own bonspiel. Nebraska earned its first number-one during the season.

== Venues ==
The club plays its home bonspiels at Baxter Arena in Omaha and practices at the Breslow Ice Center.

== Rivalries ==
=== Tennessee ===
Historically, the rivalry between Nebraska and Tennessee carried regional and national implications. In 2014, the "Tennebraska Cup" was established, college curling's first rivalry trophy.

=== Wayne State ===
Nebraska and Wayne State have maintained an annual in-state rivalry since the Wildcats established a curling club in 2014.

=== Minnesota ===
Nebraska and the University of Minnesota maintain an informal rivalry, with skips passing the "GopHusker Cardigan" back and forth at bonspiels.

== Seasons ==
| Year | Events (Note: Available results incomplete.) | National championship (Note: The national championship was an open event prior to the establishment of the USA Curling College Championship in 2013.) | Final rank (Note: Established in 2013 based on merit points earned for participating, winning, and hosting events.) |
|---|---|---|---|
Aksarben Curling League (2007–present)
| 2007–08 | Irish Open (0–3, 12th) | 4–1 (3rd, Division IV) | |
| 2008–09 | | 0–3 (Division III) | |
| 2009–10 | | | |
| 2010–11 | | 0–3 (Division III); 1–2 (Division IV) | |
| 2011–12 | Rice Lake College Bonspiel (1–3, 7th) | 3–1 (2nd, Division III); 2–2 (Division III) | |
| 2012–13 | Tennessee College Bonspiel (1–2, 4th); Rice Lake College Bonspiel (1–4, 8th); Carroll College Bonspiel† (2–2, 4th; 1–3, 8th); Johnniespiel (2–2, 4th) | 0–3 (Round robin) | 13 |
| 2013–14 | Rice Lake College Bonspiel† (2–2, 7th; 2–1, N/A); Carroll College Bonspiel† (2–2, 4th; 1–3, N/A) | 2–1 (Round robin) | 5 |
| 2014–15 | Butler Bulldog Bonspiel† (5–0, 1st; 3–2, 2nd); Rice Lake College Bonspiel (2–2, N/A); Carroll College Bonspiel† (2–2, 7th; 1–3, 8th); Big Red Bonspiel† (4–0, 1st; 2–2, 4th); Irish Open (1–2, N/A) | 1–2 (Round robin) | 1 |
| 2015–16 | Not available | Round robin | 4 |
| 2016–17 | Not available | Runner-up | 7 |
| 2017–18 | Not available | Runner-up | 5 |
| 2018–19 | Not available | Round robin | 4 |
| 2019–20 | Not available | Canceled (Note: Canceled due to the COVID-19 pandemic.) | 2 |
| 2020–21 | Canceled | | |
| 2021–22 | Not available | Round robin | 8 |
| 2022–23 | Not available | | 17 |

† Nebraska entered multiple teams
