= Sweden at the 2025 Winter World University Games =

- IOC code: SWE
- NOC: Sveriges Akademiska Idrottsförbund

in Turin, Italy 13 January 2025 – 23 January 2025
- Competitors: 60 (42 men and 18 women) in 8 sports
- Flag bearers: Moa Gustafson (freestyle skiing); Gabriel Folkesson (figure skating)
- Medals Ranked 14th: Gold 2 Silver 7 Bronze 0 Total 9

Winter Universiade appearances
- 1960; 1962; 1964; 1966; 1968; 1972; 1978; 1981; 1983; 1985; 1987; 1989; 1991; 1993; 1995; 1997; 1999; 2001; 2003; 2005; 2007; 2009; 2011; 2013; 2015; 2017; 2019; 2023; 2025

Sweden competed at the 2025 Winter World University Games in Turin, Italy, from 13 to 23 January 2025.

== Medalists ==
Sweden finished in fourteenth place in the medal table with nine medals.

Medal	Name	Sport	Event	Date
Gold	Anna Falk; Emil Nyberg; Stella Rodling Swanberg; Carl Lindqvist	Alpine skiing	Mixed team parallel	20 January
Gold	Erik Wahlberg	Freestyle skiing	Men's ski cross	22 January
Silver	Sophie Nyberg	Alpine skiing	Women's alpine combined	15 January
Silver	Sophie Nyberg	Alpine skiing	Women's super-g	17 January
Silver	Emil Nyberg	Alpine skiing	Men's super-g	17 January
Silver	Knut Vikström	Biathlon	Men's 10km sprint	18 January
Silver	Jonatan Ståhl	Ski orienteering	Men's sprint	19 January
Silver	Anna Aasa; Jonatan Ståhl	Ski orienteering	Mixed sprint relay	21 January
Silver	Karl Grönland	Biathlon	Men's 15km mass start	22 January

== Competitors ==
At the 2025 Winter World University Games was participated 60 athletes. Moa Gustafson (freestyle skiing) and Gabriel Folkesson (figure skating) were a flag bearers at the opening ceremony.

Sport	Men	Women	Total
Alpine skiing	8	5	13
Biathlon	3	3	6
Curling	4	4	8
Figure skating	3	2	5
Freestyle skiing	2	2	4
Ice hockey	20	0	20
Ski orienteering	2	2	4
Total	42	18	60
