= Norway at the 2025 Winter World University Games =

- IOC code: NOR
- NOC: The Norwegian Association of University Sports

in Turin, Italy 13 January 2025 – 23 January 2025
- Competitors: 39 (21 men and 18 women) in 7 sports
- Medals Ranked 13th: Gold 3 Silver 1 Bronze 0 Total 4

Winter Universiade appearances
- 1960; 1962; 1964; 1966; 1968; 1972; 1978; 1981; 1983; 1985; 1987; 1989; 1991; 1993; 1995; 1997; 1999; 2001; 2003; 2005; 2007; 2009; 2011; 2013; 2015; 2017; 2019; 2023; 2025

Norway competed at the 2025 Winter World University Games in Turin, Italy, from 13 to 23 January 2025.

== Medalists ==
Norway finished in thirteenth place in the medal table with four medals.

Medal	Name	Sport	Event	Date
Gold	Olaf Talmo	Cross-country skiing	Men's 10km individual free	15 January
Gold	Teodor Hjelseth	Ski orienteering	Men's sprint	19 January
Gold	Lukas Høstmælingen; Grunde Buraas; Magnus Lillebø; Tinius Nordbye	Curling	Men	23 January
Silver	Idunn Strand	Ski orienteering	Women's sprint	19 January

== Competitors ==
At the 2025 Winter World University Games 39 athletes participated.

Sport	Men	Women	Total
Cross-country skiing	6	5	11
Curling	5	5	10
Figure skating	0	2	2
Short track speed skating	1	1	2
Ski mountaineering	2	0	2
Ski orienteering	6	5	11
Snowboarding	1	0	1
Total	21	18	39
