= Croatia at the 2025 Winter World University Games =

- IOC code: CRO
- NOC: Croatian Academic Sports Federation

in Turin, Italy 13 January 2025 – 23 January 2025
- Competitors: 6 (3 men and 3 women) in 5 sports
- Flag bearer: Marko Skender (cross-country skiing)
- Medals Ranked 26th: Gold 0 Silver 0 Bronze 1 Total 1

Winter Universiade appearances
- 1960; 1962; 1964; 1966; 1968; 1972; 1978; 1981; 1983; 1985; 1987; 1989; 1991; 1993; 1995; 1997; 1999; 2001; 2003; 2005; 2007; 2009; 2011; 2013; 2015; 2017; 2019; 2023; 2025

Croatia competed at the 2025 Winter World University Games in Turin, Italy, from 13 to 23 January 2025.

== Medalists ==
Croatia finished on the twenty-sixth place in the medal table with one medal. It was the first medal for Croatia at the Winter World University Games

Medal	Name	Sport	Event	Date
Bronze	Karla Kordić	Para-alpine skiing	Women's giant slalom vi	18 January

== Competitors ==
At the 2025 Winter World University Games was participated 6 athletes. Marko Skender (cross-country skiing) was a flag bearer at the opening ceremony.

Sport	Men	Women	Total
Alpine skiing	1	0	1
Cross-country skiing	1	0	1
Figure skating	0	1	1
Para-alpine skiing	0	1	1
Short track speed skating	1	1	2
Total	3	3	6
