= College Curling USA =

US governing body of collegiate curling

College Curling USA is the governing body of collegiate curling in the US. The organization acts as the NCAA does in other college sports — setting game play, eligibility, and organizational rules. College Curling USA is affiliated with United States Curling Association (USCA), the organization responsible for organizing Olympic teams.

== History ==
The concept of college curling in the United States began in the late 1980s when the Illinois State Curling Foundation (ISCF) began to look into creating a college league, filling a gap between junior and adult curling levels. The ISCF, along with curling clubs, began promoting curling to schools. National Tournament began in the early 1990s with only a few schools in Northern Illinois and Wisconsin. Since then, has boomed to more than 40 schools- mostly in the Northern tier of the US and Northeast US. New Programs are starting all over the US as new clubs are being established.

In the 2012-13 season, more than 200 curlers from 36 colleges or universities participated in College Curling USA sanctioned events.

In September 2013, the College Championship became a United States Curling Association sanctioned event.

For the 2014 Curling College Championship held in Blaine, MN, Taco Bell became an official corporate sponsor.

Before the pandemic, the USA Curling College Tour and Championship had over 450 registered college students, participating in 15 college only bonspiels from the East Coast to the Midwest.

== Format ==
College teams compete in regional categories:

Until 2013 the regions were:

- Grand National (East Coast)
- Great Lakes
- Minnesota
- North Dakota
- Wisconsin

For the 2013 and 2014 championships, the regions were:

- Region 1: Pennsylvania, Maryland, New Jersey, Delaware, New York, Connecticut, Massachusetts, Rhode Island, Vermont, New Hampshire, and Maine
- Region 2: Lower Michigan, Ohio, and Indiana
- Region 3: Upper Michigan, Wisconsin, and Illinois
- Region 4: Minnesota and North Dakota
- Region 5: Remainder of the US

For the 2015 through 2017 championship the regions were:

- Region 1: Connecticut, Maine, Massachusetts, New Hampshire, Rhode Island, and Vermont
- Region 2: Delaware, Maryland, New Jersey, New York, and Pennsylvania
- Region 3: Indiana, Illinois, Lower Michigan, Ohio, and Southern Wisconsin
- Region 4: Upper Michigan, Minnesota, North Dakota, and Northern Wisconsin
- Region 5: Remainder of the US

After 2017 the regional aspect of the championship was abandoned except for the relabeling of the former "Region 5" as the "Emerging Region."

After 2023 the "Emerging Region" was relabeled the "West Region." Before this change, all new college curling programs began in the Emerging Region, regardless of their school's location. This was in addition to the existing college curling programs located out West, which were originally given the label "Emerging" due to their geographic remoteness within the broader college curling world. This label change made the composition of all the regions purely geographic.

Since then, the three regions have been Northeast, Midwest, and West. The number of teams that receive nationals berths from each region varies year-to-year depending on that respective region's size (number of participating schools).

Invitations to the National Championship are awarded based on accumulated 'merit points'. Points are primarily earned by hosting and/or competing in a collegiate bonspiel. Points can also be collected through non-bonspiel (Match Play) intercollegiate play or, for the West Region schools only (due to their remoteness relative to the other regions and each other), through other non-collegiate/local bonspiels and league play. College athletes must be members of USA Curling and full-time students at the school they represent in order to earn points.

The national tournament is typically held in March.

=== Competing schools ===
- Arizona State University
- Babson College
- Bowdoin College
- Butler University
- Bowling Green State University
- Carthage College
- Castleton University
- Colgate University
- Colorado School of Mines
- Colorado State University
- Creighton University
- Hamilton College
- Harvard University
- Johns Hopkins University
- Minnesota State University, Mankato
- Massachusetts Institute of Technology
- Michigan Technological University
- Pennsylvania State University
- Princeton University
- Rensselaer Polytechnic Institute
- Rochester Institute of Technology
- SUNY Polytechnic Institute
- Syracuse University
- United States Naval Academy
- University of Denver
- University of Michigan
- University of Minnesota
- University of Nebraska–Lincoln
- University of Nebraska Omaha
- University of Notre Dame
- University of Pennsylvania
- University of Toledo
- University of Wisconsin–Madison
- University of Wisconsin–Stevens Point
- Villanova University
- Western Michigan University
- Yale University

== 2026 National Tournament ==
- Location: Schenectady, NY
- Teams: 16
- Format: Four pool round-robin
- Scheduled: March 12–15, 2026
- Gold: University of Wisconsin - Madison
- Silver: University of Wisconsin - Stevens Point
- Bronze: Penn State
- Fourth: Bowdoin
- Fifth: Rochester Institute of Technology
- Sixth: University of Minnesota - Twin Cities
- Seventh: Michigan Technological University
- Eighth: Yale University

== 2025 National Tournament ==
- Location: Midland, MI
- Teams: 16
- Format: Four pool round-robin
- Scheduled: March 7–9, 2025
- Gold: University of Wisconsin - Madison
- Silver: Michigan Technological University
- Bronze: RPI
- Fourth: Bowdoin
- Fifth: MIT
- Sixth: Navy
- Seventh: RIT
- Eighth: Harvard

== 2024 National Tournament ==
- Location: Rice Lake, WI
- Teams: 16
- Format: Four pool round-robin
- Scheduled: March 8–10, 2024
- Gold: University of Wisconsin - Madison
- Silver: Princeton University
- Bronze: Michigan Technological University
- Fourth: University of Wisconsin - Stevens Point
- Consolation: MIT

== 2023 National Tournament ==
- Location: Bowling Green, OH
- Teams: 16
- Format: Four pool round-robin
- Scheduled: March 10–12, 2023
- Gold: University of Pennsylvania
- Silver: Princeton University
- Bronze: University of Wisconsin - Superior
- Fourth: University of Minnesota
- Consolation: MIT

== 2022 National Tournament ==
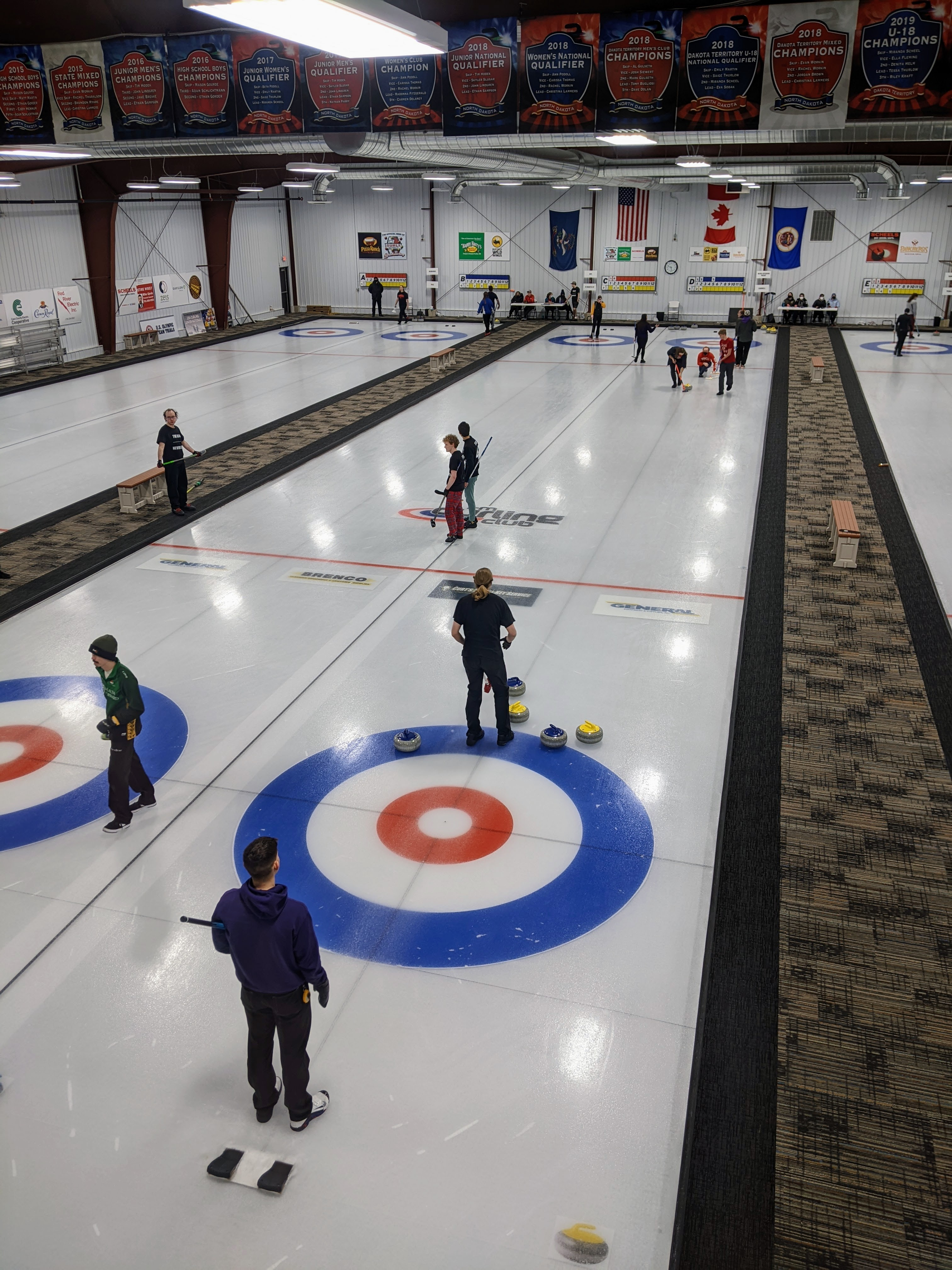
Friday evening session of the 2022 College Curling National Tournament hosted at the FM Curling Club.

- Location: Fargo, ND - Fargo-Moorhead Curling Club
- Teams: 16
- Format: Four pool round-robin
- Champion: University of Wisconsin - Stevens Point
- Runner-up: University of Pennsylvania
- Third: University of Wisconsin - Superior
- Fourth: Harvard
- Consolation: North Dakota State University

2022 USA Curling College Tour Results (Red indicates championship invitation)

School	Points
Wisc-StevensPt	105
RPI	82
Syracuse	81
Villanova	66
Univ of Penn	64
MIT	55
Harvard	53.5
Neb-Lincoln	53
N Dakota St	50
Wisc-Superior	45
Minnesota	44
Cornell	44
Hamilton	44
Wisc-GreenBay	44
Bowdoin	42
PennState	40
Yale	34.5
NotreDame	34
Colgate	10
RIT	10

Note: Wisc-Green Bay declined their invitation. Yale was invited in their place.

== 2020 and 2021 National Tournaments ==
Canceled due to the Covid Pandemic. The entirety of the 2020-2021 College Tour was canceled. The 2019-2020 College Tour took place as normal. The tour season was completed and the invitations had been sent out when the pandemic conditions reached a level where it was determined that the event could not take place. The National Championship was scheduled to take place at the Fargo-Moorhead Curling Club in Fargo, ND.

2020 USA Curling College Tour Results (Red indicates championship invitation)

School	Points
RPI	187.2
Nebraska	176.8
Harvard	161.3
RIT	158.9
Bowdoin	148.7
Yale	143.5
Hamilton	132.9
Syracuse	125.9
MIT	119.8
Wisc-StevensPt	118.8
Villanova	118.0
NDakotaSt	116.3
PennState	115.8
Colgate	113.8
PennU	88.8
WayneState	86.5
Minnesota	71.6
Wisc-GreenBay	62.2
Oklahoma	61.3
Denver	44.7
SUNY-Poly	40.2
Castleton	26.1
Carthage	15.3
NotreDame	12.0
ColbyCollege	8.8
Creighton	8.0
Maine	4.4

== 2019 National Tournament ==
- Location: Wayland, MA - Broomstones Curling Club
- Teams: 16
- Format: Four pool round-robin
- Champion: North Dakota State University
- Runner-up: SUNY Polytechnic Institute
- Third: Massachusetts Institute of Technology
- Fourth: Yale University
- Consolation: Syracuse University

2019 USA Curling College Tour Results (Red indicates championship invitation)

School	Points
SUNY-Poly	191.667
NDakotaSt	149.875
RPI	148.533
Nebraska	142.667
Wisc-StevensPt	142.092
Colgate	137.600
Bowdoin	133.400
MIT	128.800
RIT	122.150
Yale	120.800
Harvard	117.108
Hamilton	109.417
StNorbert	108.000
Minnesota	106.625
Syracuse	101.850
Oklahoma	99.500
Villanova	93.750
WayneState	83.583
Penn	70.438
Wisc-GreenBay	39.500
Castleton	24.750
Cornell	23.750
Unity	17.800
Denver	12.000
NotreDame	8.000
Maine	7.000
Purdue	2.000

== 2018 National Tournament ==
- Location: Eau Claire, WI - Eau Claire Curling Club
- Teams: 16
- Format: Four pool round-robin
- Champion: University of Wisconsin - Stevens Point
- Runner-up: University of Nebraska - Lincoln
- Third: Yale University
- Fourth: University of Pennsylvania
- Consolation: Rochester Institute of Technology

2018 USA Curling College Tour Results (Red indicates championship invitation)

School	Region	Points
RPI	2	107.175
SUNY-Poly	2	86.875
Oklahoma	5	82.500
Bowdoin	1	77.167
Nebraska	5	76.333
Yale	1	71.600
Wisc-StevensPt	3	68.000
MIT	1	67.325
Wisc-GreenBay	3	62.000
RIT	2	58.250
StNorbert	3	55.333
Colgate	2	55.000
Harvard	1	53.375
Hamilton	2	46.825
Penn	2	46.417
WayneState	5	43.666
Maine	1	38.375
Minnesota	4	33.000
Villanova	2	21.917
Denver	5	18.333
Tufts		10.800
BowlGreen	3	8.500
NotreDame	3	6.000
Creighton	5	0.667
Haverford	2	0.667

== 2017 National Tournament ==
- Location: Whitesboro, NY - Utica Curling Club
- Teams: 16
- Format: Four pool round-robin
- Champion: University of Minnesota
- Runner-up: University of Nebraska - Lincoln
- Third: University of Wisconsin - Stevens Point
- Fourth: Harvard University

2017 USA Curling College Tour Results (Red indicates championship invitation)

School	Region	Points
RPI	2	95.295
SUNY-Poly	2	88.000
Oklahoma	5	72.000
Yale	1	67.400
Wisc-StevensPt	3	65.600
Bowdoin	1	60.837
Nebraska	5	60.000
Penn	2	56.700
WayneState	5	56.000
Hamilton	2	48.667
RIT	2	42.500
MIT	1	41.233
Wisc-GreenBay	3	39.000
Harvard	1	36.667
StNorbert	3	36.000
Villanova	2	35.000
Colgate	2	33.667
Minnesota	4	25.000
BowlGreen	3	16.333
Maine	1	14.500
BostonUniv	1	6.000
Carroll	3	6.000
Haverford	2	5.250
NotreDame	3	5.000
Denver	5	1.000
Cal-Berkeley	5	1.000

== 2016 National Tournament ==
- Location: Chaska, MN - Chaska Curling Center
- Teams: 16
- Format: Four pool round-robin
- Champion: University of Pennsylvania
- Runner-up: University of Minnesota
- Third: Massachusetts Institute of Technology
- Fourth: Colgate University
- Fifth: Hamilton College

2016 USA Curling College Results (Red indicates championship invitation)

School	Region	Points
RPI	2	77.333
RIT	2	72
Bowdoin	1	71
Nebraska	5	68.425
Yale	1	65.23
Wisc-StevensPt	3	61
Colgate	2	59
SUNY-Poly	2	51.58
Hamilton	2	51
Harvard	1	49.917
Penn	2	49.36
Minnesota	4	48
Denver	5	44.75
Wisc-GreenBay (declined)	3	41.5
MIT	1	40.95
Oklahoma	5	40.625
WayneState	5	37.975
Carroll	3	32.375
MichTech	4	31
BostonUniv	1	29.5
Villanova	2	20.555
Cal-Berkeley	5	14
ColSchofMines	5	13
BowlGreen	3	12.25
Maine	1	11
Marquette	3	10.5
Creighton	5	8
Haverford	2	7
StNorbert	3	5
NebMedCntr	5	4.9
Butler	3	3
UticaColl	2	1.75
Wellesley	1	1
WaukTech	3	0.75

== 2015 National Tournament ==
- Location: Rochester, NY - Rochester Curling Club
- Teams: 16
- Format: Four pool round-robin
- Champion: University of Wisconsin - Stevens Point
- Runner-up: University of Pennsylvania
- Third: Massachusetts Institute of Technology
- Fourth: Rochester Institute of Technology
- Fifth: Boston University

== 2014 National Tournament ==
The 2014 College Championship was the first to be officially recognized by the USCA.

- Location: Blaine, MN - Four Seasons Curling Club
- Teams: 16
- Format: Four pool round-robin
- Champion: University of Wisconsin - Green Bay
- Runner-up: Villanova University
- Third: Carroll University
- Fourth: Massachusetts Institute of Technology

== 2013 National Tournament ==
- Location: Duluth, MN - Duluth Curling Club
- Teams: 16
- Format: Four pool round-robin
- Champion: University of Minnesota
- Runner-up: College of Saint Benedict/ Saint John's University (MN)
- Third: Massachusetts Institute of Technology
- Fourth: Boston University

== 2011 National Tournament ==
- Location: Chicago, IL - Northshore Curling Club and Chicago Curling Club
- Teams: 32
- Divisions: 4
- Format: Round robin

The first-place teams in each division:

- Division 1 - *Massachusetts Institute of Technology
- Division 2 - Villanova
- Division 3 - Northwestern University
- Division 4 - Bowdoin College

== 2010 National Tournament ==
- Location: Chicago, IL - Northshore Curling Club and Chicago Curling Club
- Teams: 32
- Divisions: 4
- Format: Round robin

The first-place teams in each division

- Division 1 - University of Wisconsin Oshkosh
- Division 2 - Northwestern University
- Division 3 - Northwestern University
- Division 4 - Carroll College

== 2009 National Tournament ==
- Location: Chicago, IL - Northshore Curling Club and Chicago Curling Club
- Teams: 32
- Divisions: 4
- Format: Round robin

The first-place teams in each division

- Division 1 - University of Minnesota
- Division 2 - Hamilton College
- Division 3 - University of Tennessee
- Division 4 - Northwestern University

== 2008 National Tournament ==
The 2008 College Curling National Bonspiel was held in Chicago, IL in March at the Northshore Curling Club and Chicago Curling Club. 34 teams participated this year separated into 4 divisions separated by combined years of experience.

The first-place teams in each division

- Division 1 - University of Wisconsin Eau Claire
- Division 2 - Northwestern University
- Division 3 - Hamilton College
- Division 4 - Yale/Hamilton College

== Tournament sponsors ==
- United States Curling Association (USCA)
- Illinois State Curling Foundation
- Chicago Community Trust

== See also ==
- College athletics
- List of College Curling Champions
