= Finland at the 2025 Winter World University Games =

- IOC code: FIN
- NOC: Finnish Student Sports Federation

in Turin, Italy 13 January 2025 – 23 January 2025
- Competitors: 33 in 6 sports
- Flag bearers: Viivi Paljärvi, Inkki Inola
- Medals Ranked 3rd: Gold 8 Silver 3 Bronze 4 Total 15

Winter Universiade appearances
- 1960; 1962; 1964; 1966; 1968; 1972; 1978; 1981; 1983; 1985; 1987; 1989; 1991; 1993; 1995; 1997; 1999; 2001; 2003; 2005; 2007; 2009; 2011; 2013; 2015; 2017; 2019; 2023; 2025

Finland competed at the 2025 Winter World University Games in Turin, Italy, from 13 to 23 January 2025.

== Medalists ==
Finland finished on the third place in the medal table with 15 medals.

| Medal | Name | Sport | Event | Date |
|---|---|---|---|---|
| Gold | Akseli Ahvenainen | Freestyle skiing | Men's moguls | 14 January |
| Gold | Inkki Inola | Para-cross-country skiing | Men's 10 km free technique vision impaired | 15 January |
| Gold | Inkki Inola | Para-cross-country skiing | Men's sprint classic technique vision impaired | 17 January |
| Gold | Nette Kiviranta | Para-alpine skiing | Women's giant slalom sitting | 18 January |
| Gold | Amanda Yli-Futka | Ski orienteering | Women's sprint | 19 January |
| Gold | Hanna Ray; Elsa Torvinen; Iida Vuollet; Anni Lindroos | Cross-country skiing | Women's 4 x 7.5km relay | 21 January |
| Gold | Amanda Yli-Futka; Niklas Ekström | Ski orienteering | Mixed sprint relay | 21 January |
| Gold | Markus Kasanen | Cross-country skiing | Men's 20km mass start classic | 23 January |
| Silver | Patrik Kuuttinen | Biathlon | Men's 15km short individual | 14 January |
| Silver | Nico Bennert | Cross-country skiing | Men's 10km individual free | 15 January |
| Silver | Valtteri Pennanen | Cross-country skiing | Men's sprint classic | 17 January |
| Bronze | Markus Kasanen | Cross-country skiing | Men's sprint classic | 17 January |
| Bronze | Anni Lindroos | Cross-country skiing | Women's sprint classic | 17 January |
| Bronze | Topias Kemppi; Markus Kasanen; Eelis Valikainen; Nico Bennert | Cross-country skiing | Men's 4 x 7.5km relay | 21 January |
| Bronze | Nico Bennert | Cross-country skiing | Men's 20km mass start classic | 23 January |

== Competitors ==
At the 2025 Winter World University Games was participated 33 athletes. Amanda Yli-Futka took part in cross-country skiing and ski orienteering

| Sport | Men | Women | Total |
|---|---|---|---|
| Biathlon | 2 | 4 | 6 |
| Cross-country skiing | 6 | 7 | 13 |
| Figure skating | 1 | 1 | 2 |
| Freestyle skiing | 2 | 2 | 4 |
| Para-alpine skiing | 0 | 1 | 1 |
| Para-cross-country skiing | 1 | 0 | 1 |
| Ski orienteering | 2 | 5 | 7 |
| Total | 14 | 20 | 34 |
