= Great Britain at the 2025 Winter World University Games =

- IOC code: GBR
- NOC: British Universities & Colleges Sport

in Turin, Italy 13 January 2025 – 23 January 2025
- Competitors: 53 (17 men and 36 women) in 7 sports
- Flag bearers: Robyn Munro (curling); Ethan Clarke (biathlon)
- Medals Ranked 19th: Gold 1 Silver 2 Bronze 0 Total 3

Winter Universiade appearances
- 1960; 1962; 1964; 1966; 1968; 1972; 1978; 1981; 1983; 1985; 1987; 1989; 1991; 1993; 1995; 1997; 1999; 2001; 2003; 2005; 2007; 2009; 2011; 2013; 2015; 2017; 2019; 2023; 2025

Great Britain competed at the 2025 Winter World University Games in Turin, Italy, from 13 to 23 January 2025.

== Medalists ==
Great Britain finished on the nineteenth place in the medal table with three medals.

Medal	Name	Sport	Event	Date
Gold	Robyn Munro; Orrin Carson	Curling	Mixed doubles	14 January
Silver	Lara Shaw	Freestyle skiing	Women's freeski slopestyle	17 January
Silver	Hollie Smith	Snowboarding	Women's snowboard big air	19 January

== Competitors ==
At the 2025 Winter World University Games was participated 53 athletes. Robyn Munro (curling) and Ethan Clarke (biathlon) were a flag bearers at the opening ceremony.

Sport	Men	Women	Total
Alpine skiing	3	1	4
Biathlon	1	1	2
Cross-country skiing	3	1	4
Curling	6	6	12
Freestyle skiing	2	4	6
Ice hockey	0	22	22
Snowboarding	2	1	3
Total	17	36	53
