= Ski mountaineering at the 2025 Winter World University Games =

Ski mountaineering at the Torino 2025 FISU World University Games
- Ski mountaineering pictogram
- Venue: Sestriere Colle
- Dates: 16–19 January 2025
- Competitors: 54 from 13 nations

Ski mountaineering at the 2025 Winter World University Games was held at Sestriere Colle from 16 to 19 January 2025, marking its debut at Winter World University Games.

== Men's events ==
| Event | Gold | | Silver | | Bronze | |
|---|---|---|---|---|---|---|
| Sprint | Finn Hösch; Germany | 3:59.90 | Pablo Giner; France | 4:00.70 | Felix Gramelsberger; Germany | 4:12.96 |
| Vertical race | Rémi Cantan; France | 13:22.5 | Felix Gramelsberger; Germany | 13:35.6 | Eliott Robin-Saje; France | 13:42.6 |

== Women's events ==
| Event | Gold | | Silver | | Bronze | |
|---|---|---|---|---|---|---|
| Sprint | Margot Ravinel; France | 4:45.80 | María Ordoñez; Spain | 5:04.86 | Ares Torra; Spain | 5:07.21 |
| Vertical race | Margot Ravinel; France | 16:01.5 | María Ordoñez; Spain | 16:04.3 | Noemi Junod; Italy | 16:16.8 |

== Mixed events ==
| Event | Gold | | Silver | | Bronze | |
|---|---|---|---|---|---|---|
| Mixed relay | France; Margot Ravinel; Pablo Giner | 42:45.86 | Spain; Maria Ordoñez; Marc Ràdua | 45:20.02 | Germany; Sophia Weßling; Finn Hösch | 45:58.36 |

== Medal table ==
* Host nation (Italy)

| Rank | Nation | Gold | Silver | Bronze | Total |
|---|---|---|---|---|---|
| 1 | France | 4 | 1 | 1 | 6 |
| 2 | Germany | 1 | 1 | 2 | 4 |
| 3 | Spain | 0 | 3 | 1 | 4 |
| 4 | Italy* | 0 | 0 | 1 | 1 |
| Totals (4 entries) | | 5 | 5 | 5 | 15 |

== Participating nations ==
- Austria (2)
- China (2)
- Czech Republic (4)
- France (10)
- Germany (4)
- Italy (8) (Hosts)
- Norway (2)
- Poland (5)
- Slovakia (2)
- South Korea (1)
- Spain (6)
- Thailand (1)
- United States (7)
