= Curling at the 2025 Winter World University Games =

- Host city: Turin, Italy
- Arena: Palasport Tazzoli
- Dates: January 11–23

Curling at the 2025 Winter World University Games took place at the Palasport Tazzoli in Turin, Italy. The event took place from Saturday, January 11 to Thursday, January 23. This event also marked the debut of mixed doubles at the Winter World University Games.

== Medal summary ==
=== Medal table ===
Rank	Nation	Gold	Silver	Bronze	Total
1	Great Britain	1	0	0	1
1	Japan	1	0	0	1
1	Norway	1	0	0	1
4	Germany	0	1	0	1
4	South Korea	0	1	0	1
4	United States	0	1	0	1
7	Canada	0	0	2	2
8	Switzerland	0	0	1	1
Totals (8 entries)		3	3	3	9

=== Medalists ===
Event	Gold	Silver	Bronze
Men's	Norway; Lukas Høstmælingen; Grunde Morten Burås; Magnus Lunde Lillebø; Tinius Haslev Nordbye	United States; Caden Hebert; Jackson Bestland; Jackson Armstrong; Jack Wendtland; Connor Kauffman	Switzerland; Jan Iseli; Maximilian Winz; Dean Hürlimann; Sandro Fanchini
Women's	Japan; Yuina Miura; Kohane Tsuruga; Eri Ogihara; Rin Suzuki; Ai Matsunaga	South Korea; Kang Bo-bae; Kim Min-seo; Shim Yu-jeong; Kim Ji-soo; Jeong Jae-hee	Canada; Serena Gray-Withers; Catherine Clifford; Brianna Cullen; Zoe Cinnamon; Gracelyn Richard
Mixed Doubles	Great Britain; Robyn Munro; Orrin Carson	Germany; Kim Sutor; Klaudius Harsch	Canada; Jessica Zheng; Victor Pietrangelo

== Men ==
=== Teams ===
The teams are listed as follows:

Canada	China	Great Britain	Italy	Norway
University of Regina, Regina Skip: Josh Bryden; Third: Adam Bukurak; Second: Carter Williamson; Lead: Ryan Grabarczyk; Alternate: Ayden Wittmire	Harbin Sport University, Harbin Skip: Meng Tianyu; Third: Hou Fuqiang; Second: Yu Sen; Lead: Liang Zhengzhao; Alternate: Li Zan	Abertay University, Dundee; Edinburgh Napier University, Edinburgh Skip: Arran Thomson; Third: Ross Craik; Second: Kaleb Johnson; Lead: Rory MacNair; Alternate: Fraser Swanson	Ca' Foscari University of Venice, Venice; Unipegaso, Naples Skip: Giacomo Colli; Third: Stefano Gilli; Second: Andrea Gilli; Lead: Francesco Vigliani; Alternate: Stefano Spiller	INN University, Innlandet; NTNU, Trondheim Skip: Lukas Høstmælingen; Third: Grunde Morten Burås; Second: Magnus Lunde Lillebø; Lead: Tinius Haslev Nordbye
South Korea	Sweden	Switzerland	Ukraine	United States
Kyungil University, Gyeongsan Skip: Lee Jae-beom; Third: Kim Hyo-jun; Second: Pyo Jeong-min; Lead: Kim Eun-bin; Alternate: Kim Jin-hun	Linköping University, Linköping; Uppsala University, Uppsala Skip: Axel Landelius; Third: Alfons Johansson; Second: Alexander Palm; Lead: Jacob Hanna	University of Bern, Bern; University of Zurich, Zurich Skip: Jan Iseli; Third: Maximilian Winz; Second: Dean Hürlimann; Lead: Sandro Fanchini	National University of Ukraine on Physical Education and Sport, Kyiv Skip: Eduard Nikolov; Third: Yaroslav Shchur; Second: Artem Suhak; Lead: Vladyslav Koval; Alternate: Artem Hasynets	CV Technical College, Eau Claire; Rosalind Franklin University, Chicago Skip: Caden Hebert; Third: Jackson Bestland; Second: Jackson Armstrong; Lead: Jack Wendtland; Alternate: Connor Kauffman

=== Round-robin standings ===
Final Round Robin Standings

Key
Teams to Playoffs

Country	Skip	W	L	W–L	PF	PA	EW	EL	BE	SE	DSC
Norway	Lukas Høstmælingen	8	1	1–0	71	34	34	24	4	12	40.65
United States	Caden Hebert	8	1	0–1	58	35	31	25	6	11	42.93
Canada	Josh Bryden	5	4	2–1; 1–0	46	39	28	24	5	5	36.86
Switzerland	Jan Iseli	5	4	2–1; 0–1	47	46	29	27	8	5	42.76
South Korea	Lee Jae-beom	5	4	1–2; 1–0	43	39	28	25	10	7	46.94
Italy	Giacomo Colli	5	4	1–2; 0–1	52	45	31	27	5	7	39.06
Sweden	Axel Landelius	3	6	1–0	38	62	22	32	4	3	66.37
Ukraine	Eduard Nikolov	3	6	0–1	41	56	27	31	2	4	45.04
Great Britain	Arran Thomson	2	7	–	38	52	26	32	6	7	73.24
China	Meng Tianyu	1	8	–	35	61	26	35	1	8	68.15

Round Robin Summary Table
Pos.	Country	Canada	China	Great Britain	Italy	Norway	South Korea	Sweden	Switzerland	Ukraine	United States	Record
3	Canada	—N/a	6–2	2–3	3–7	4–10	5–2	8–2	7–5	7–1	4–7	5–4
10	China	2–6	—N/a	6–5	6–7	3–8	2–7	3–9	5–6	3–6	5–7	1–8
9	Great Britain	3–2	5–6	—N/a	4–7	3–8	3–5	5–7	3–4	8–6	4–7	2–7
6	Italy	7–3	7–6	7–4	—N/a	2–9	4–5	9–4	4–7	7–1	5–6	5–4
1	Norway	10–4	8–3	8–3	9–2	—N/a	4–6	12–2	8–5	8–6	4–3	8–1
5	South Korea	2–5	7–2	5–3	5–4	6–4	—N/a	5–2	5–7	5–6	3–6	5–4
7	Sweden	2–8	9–3	7–5	4–9	2–12	2–5	—N/a	1–6	7–4	4–10	3–6
4	Switzerland	5–7	6–5	4–3	7–4	5–8	7–5	6–1	—N/a	5–7	2–6	5–4
8	Ukraine	1–7	6–3	6–8	1–7	6–8	6–5	4–7	7–5	—N/a	4–6	3–6
2	United States	7–4	7–5	7–4	6–5	3–4	6–3	10–4	6–2	6–4	—N/a	8–1

=== Round-robin results ===
All draw times are listed in Central European Time (UTC+01:00).

==== Draw 1 ====
Wednesday, January 15, 19:00

Sheet A	1	2	3	4	5	6	7	8	Final
Ukraine (Nikolov)	0	1	0	2	0	1	0	X	4
Sweden (Landelius) 🔨	1	0	4	0	1	0	1	X	7

Sheet B	1	2	3	4	5	6	7	8	Final
Canada (Bryden)	0	1	0	4	0	1	0	1	7
Switzerland (Iseli) 🔨	0	0	1	0	2	0	2	0	5

Sheet C	1	2	3	4	5	6	7	8	Final
China (Meng)	0	0	1	0	1	4	0	0	6
Italy (Colli) 🔨	2	1	0	1	0	0	2	1	7

Sheet D	1	2	3	4	5	6	7	8	Final
United States (Hebert)	0	1	0	0	0	1	1	0	3
Norway (Høstmælingen) 🔨	0	0	2	1	0	0	0	1	4

Sheet E	1	2	3	4	5	6	7	8	Final
Great Britain (Thomson) 🔨	0	2	0	0	0	1	0	X	3
South Korea (Lee)	1	0	1	0	0	0	3	X	5

==== Draw 2 ====
Thursday, January 16, 14:00

Sheet A	1	2	3	4	5	6	7	8	Final
Switzerland (Iseli) 🔨	0	0	0	1	0	1	0	X	2
United States (Hebert)	0	0	2	0	3	0	1	X	6

Sheet B	1	2	3	4	5	6	7	8	Final
Sweden (Landelius)	0	0	0	0	0	2	X	X	2
Norway (Høstmælingen) 🔨	0	4	3	2	3	0	X	X	12

Sheet C	1	2	3	4	5	6	7	8	Final
Great Britain (Thomson)	2	0	0	2	0	0	3	1	8
Ukraine (Nikolov) 🔨	0	3	2	0	0	1	0	0	6

Sheet D	1	2	3	4	5	6	7	8	9	Final
South Korea (Lee) 🔨	0	1	0	1	0	0	2	0	1	5
Italy (Colli)	0	0	1	0	1	0	0	2	0	4

Sheet E	1	2	3	4	5	6	7	8	Final
Canada (Bryden) 🔨	0	1	1	0	1	0	3	X	6
China (Meng)	0	0	0	1	0	1	0	X	2

==== Draw 3 ====
Friday, January 17, 8:00

Sheet A	1	2	3	4	5	6	7	8	Final
Italy (Colli) 🔨	0	1	0	1	0	3	2	X	7
Canada (Bryden)	0	0	1	0	2	0	0	X	3

Sheet B	1	2	3	4	5	6	7	8	Final
Ukraine (Nikolov) 🔨	2	0	1	0	0	1	0	2	6
South Korea (Lee)	0	0	0	2	1	0	2	0	5

Sheet C	1	2	3	4	5	6	7	8	Final
Sweden (Landelius) 🔨	0	2	0	0	2	0	0	X	4
United States (Hebert)	0	0	2	2	0	4	2	X	10

Sheet D	1	2	3	4	5	6	7	8	Final
China (Meng) 🔨	0	1	2	1	0	0	0	2	6
Great Britain (Thomson)	1	0	0	0	2	1	1	0	5

Sheet E	1	2	3	4	5	6	7	8	Final
Switzerland (Iseli)	0	0	1	0	2	1	0	1	5
Norway (Høstmælingen) 🔨	2	3	0	1	0	0	2	0	8

==== Draw 4 ====
Friday, January 17, 16:00

Sheet A	1	2	3	4	5	6	7	8	Final
Norway (Høstmælingen) 🔨	2	0	1	1	0	2	2	X	8
Great Britain (Thomson)	0	1	0	0	2	0	0	X	3

Sheet B	1	2	3	4	5	6	7	8	Final
China (Meng)	2	0	0	2	0	0	1	X	5
United States (Hebert) 🔨	0	2	1	0	0	4	0	X	7

Sheet C	1	2	3	4	5	6	7	8	Final
South Korea (Lee)	0	3	0	0	0	0	2	0	5
Switzerland (Iseli) 🔨	3	0	0	1	0	0	0	3	7

Sheet D	1	2	3	4	5	6	7	8	Final
Italy (Colli) 🔨	0	0	3	3	0	1	X	X	7
Ukraine (Nikolov)	0	0	0	0	1	0	X	X	1

Sheet E	1	2	3	4	5	6	7	8	Final
Sweden (Landelius)	0	0	1	0	0	0	1	X	2
Canada (Bryden) 🔨	0	1	0	4	0	3	0	X	8

==== Draw 5 ====
Saturday, January 18, 9:00

Sheet A	1	2	3	4	5	6	7	8	Final
China (Meng)	0	1	1	0	0	3	0	0	5
Switzerland (Iseli) 🔨	1	0	0	0	2	0	2	1	6

Sheet B	1	2	3	4	5	6	7	8	Final
Great Britain (Thomson) 🔨	0	1	0	0	2	0	2	0	5
Sweden (Landelius)	0	0	0	3	0	3	0	1	7

Sheet C	1	2	3	4	5	6	7	8	Final
Ukraine (Nikolov)	0	2	0	1	0	2	1	X	6
Norway (Høstmælingen) 🔨	2	0	3	0	3	0	0	X	8

Sheet D	1	2	3	4	5	6	7	8	Final
Canada (Bryden)	0	0	0	3	0	0	2	X	5
South Korea (Lee) 🔨	0	0	1	0	0	1	0	X	2

Sheet E	1	2	3	4	5	6	7	8	Final
United States (Hebert)	0	1	1	0	3	0	0	1	6
Italy (Colli) 🔨	1	0	0	1	0	2	1	0	5

==== Draw 6 ====
Saturday, January 18, 19:00

Sheet A	1	2	3	4	5	6	7	8	Final
Great Britain (Thomson)	0	1	0	2	0	1	0	X	4
Italy (Colli) 🔨	1	0	3	0	1	0	2	X	7

Sheet B	1	2	3	4	5	6	7	8	9	Final
Switzerland (Iseli)	0	2	0	1	0	0	2	0	0	5
Ukraine (Nikolov) 🔨	1	0	1	0	0	2	0	1	2	7

Sheet C	1	2	3	4	5	6	7	8	Final
United States (Hebert) 🔨	2	0	0	3	0	2	0	X	7
Canada (Bryden)	0	0	1	0	1	0	2	X	4

Sheet D	1	2	3	4	5	6	7	8	Final
Norway (Høstmælingen) 🔨	0	3	0	3	0	0	2	X	8
China (Meng)	0	0	1	0	1	1	0	X	3

Sheet E	1	2	3	4	5	6	7	8	Final
South Korea (Lee)	1	0	1	1	0	0	2	X	5
Sweden (Landelius) 🔨	0	0	0	0	1	1	0	X	2

==== Draw 7 ====
Sunday, January 19, 12:00

Sheet A	1	2	3	4	5	6	7	8	Final
Canada (Bryden) 🔨	0	1	0	1	0	2	0	X	4
Norway (Høstmælingen)	1	0	1	0	6	0	2	X	10

Sheet B	1	2	3	4	5	6	7	8	Final
South Korea (Lee) 🔨	2	1	0	1	0	2	1	X	7
China (Meng)	0	0	1	0	1	0	0	X	2

Sheet C	1	2	3	4	5	6	7	8	Final
Italy (Colli)	0	3	0	0	2	3	1	X	9
Sweden (Landelius) 🔨	1	0	2	1	0	0	0	X	4

Sheet D	1	2	3	4	5	6	7	8	Final
Great Britain (Thomson)	0	0	1	0	0	1	0	1	3
Switzerland (Iseli) 🔨	0	2	0	1	0	0	1	0	4

Sheet E	1	2	3	4	5	6	7	8	Final
Ukraine (Nikolov) 🔨	1	0	2	0	0	1	0	0	4
United States (Hebert)	0	2	0	0	2	0	0	2	6

==== Draw 8 ====
Sunday, January 19, 20:00

Sheet A	1	2	3	4	5	6	7	8	Final
Sweden (Landelius) 🔨	2	0	2	0	0	2	2	X	8
China (Meng)	0	1	0	1	1	0	0	X	3

Sheet B	1	2	3	4	5	6	7	8	Final
United States (Hebert) 🔨	1	1	0	0	0	3	1	1	7
Great Britain (Thomson)	0	0	2	2	0	0	0	0	4

Sheet C	1	2	3	4	5	6	7	8	Final
Norway (Høstmælingen)	0	1	0	1	1	0	1	0	4
South Korea (Lee) 🔨	0	0	3	0	0	0	0	3	6

Sheet D	1	2	3	4	5	6	7	8	Final
Ukraine (Nikolov)	0	0	0	0	0	1	0	X	1
Canada (Bryden) 🔨	0	1	1	2	1	0	2	X	7

Sheet E	1	2	3	4	5	6	7	8	Final
Italy (Colli) 🔨	0	0	2	0	0	2	0	X	4
Switzerland (Iseli)	0	0	0	1	4	0	2	X	7

==== Draw 9 ====
Monday, January 20, 14:00

Sheet A	1	2	3	4	5	6	7	8	Final
United States (Hebert)	1	0	2	0	0	3	0	X	6
South Korea (Lee) 🔨	0	1	0	1	0	0	1	X	3

Sheet B	1	2	3	4	5	6	7	8	Final
Norway (Høstmælingen) 🔨	0	2	0	3	0	2	2	X	9
Italy (Colli)	0	0	1	0	1	0	0	X	2

Sheet C	1	2	3	4	5	6	7	8	Final
Canada (Bryden) 🔨	0	1	0	1	0	0	0	0	2
Great Britain (Thomson)	0	0	1	0	0	0	1	1	3

Sheet D	1	2	3	4	5	6	7	8	Final
Switzerland (Iseli) 🔨	0	1	1	2	0	0	2	X	6
Sweden (Landelius)	0	0	0	0	1	0	0	X	1

Sheet E	1	2	3	4	5	6	7	8	Final
China (Meng)	0	0	1	1	0	1	0	X	3
Ukraine (Nikolov) 🔨	3	0	0	0	1	0	2	X	6

=== Playoffs ===
Semifinals
1	Norway	7
4	Switzerland	4
2	United States	8
3	Canada	4

Gold medal game
1	Norway	8
2	United States	4
Bronze medal game
4	Switzerland	6
3	Canada	1

==== Semifinals ====
Tuesday, January 21, 8:00

Sheet C	1	2	3	4	5	6	7	8	Final
United States (Hebert) 🔨	0	5	3	0	0	0	0	X	8
Canada (Bryden)	0	0	0	1	1	2	0	X	4

Player percentages
United States		Canada	
Jack Wendtland	85%	Ryan Grabarczyk	93%
Jackson Armstrong	82%	Carter Williamson	66%
Jackson Bestland	95%	Adam Bukurak	79%
Caden Hebert	79%	Josh Bryden	63%
Total	86%	Total	75%

Tuesday, January 21, 12:00

Sheet C	1	2	3	4	5	6	7	8	Final
Norway (Høstmælingen) 🔨	3	1	1	0	1	1	0	X	7
Switzerland (Iseli)	0	0	0	3	0	0	1	X	4

Player percentages
Norway		Switzerland	
Tinius Haslev Nordbye	95%	Sandro Fanchini	93%
Magnus Lunde Lillebø	88%	Dean Hürlimann	75%
Grunde Morten Burås	83%	Maximilian Winz	63%
Lukas Høstmælingen	84%	Jan Iseli	92%
Total	87%	Total	81%

==== Bronze medal game ====
Wednesday, January 22, 19:00

Team	1	2	3	4	5	6	7	8	Final
Switzerland (Iseli)	0	2	1	1	0	1	1	X	6
Canada (Bryden) 🔨	0	0	0	0	1	0	0	X	1

Player percentages
Switzerland		Canada	
Sandro Fanchini	71%	Ryan Grabarczyk	73%
Dean Hürlimann	79%	Carter Williamson	61%
Maximilian Winz	85%	Adam Bukurak	79%
Jan Iseli	88%	Josh Bryden	45%
Total	80%	Total	64%

==== Gold medal game ====
Thursday, January 23, 14:00

Team	1	2	3	4	5	6	7	8	Final
Norway (Høstmælingen) 🔨	0	0	3	0	0	2	1	2	8
United States (Hebert)	2	0	0	1	1	0	0	0	4

Player percentages
Norway		United States	
Tinius Haslev Nordbye	84%	Jack Wendtland	94%
Magnus Lunde Lillebø	77%	Jackson Armstrong	78%
Grunde Morten Burås	81%	Jackson Bestland	77%
Lukas Høstmælingen	77%	Caden Hebert	56%
Total	80%	Total	76%

=== Final standings ===
Place	Team
1st place, gold medalist(s)	Norway
2nd place, silver medalist(s)	United States
3rd place, bronze medalist(s)	Switzerland
4	Canada
5	South Korea
6	Italy
7	Sweden
8	Ukraine
9	Great Britain
10	China

== Women ==
=== Teams ===
The teams are listed as follows:

Canada	China	Great Britain	Italy	Japan
University of Alberta, Edmonton Skip: Serena Gray-Withers; Third: Catherine Clifford; Second: Brianna Cullen; Lead: Zoe Cinnamon; Alternate: Gracelyn Richard	Beijing Sport University, Beijing Skip: Pei Junhang; Third: Yin Ziyi; Second: Ye Zixuan; Lead: Tan Siting; Alternate: Qu Ruoxuan	UHI, Perth; University of Stirling, Stirling Skip: Laura Watt; Third: Amy Mitchell; Second: Holly Wilkie-Milne; Lead: Lisa Davie; Alternate: Cara Davidson	University of Verona, Verona Skip: Camilla Gilberti; Third: Lucrezia Grande; Second: Giada Zambelli; Lead: Rachele Scalese	Sapporo International University, Kiyota Skip: Yuina Miura; Third: Kohane Tsuruga; Second: Eri Ogihara; Lead: Rin Suzuki; Alternate: Ai Matsunaga
Norway	Poland	South Korea	Sweden	United States
NTNU, Trondheim Skip: Torild Bjørnstad; Third: Nora Østgård; Second: Ingeborg Forbregd; Lead: Eirin Mesloe	SGH, Warsaw Skip: Julia Dyderska; Third: Julia Jawień; Second: Martyna Szymanowska; Lead: Paulina Frysz; Alternate: Marlena Dziewirz	Korea National Open University, Seoul Skip: Kang Bo-bae; Third: Kim Min-seo; Second: Shim Yu-jeong; Lead: Kim Ji-soo; Alternate: Jeong Jae-hee	GIH, Stockholm Skip: Moa Dryburgh; Third: Thea Orefjord; Second: Moa Tjärnlund; Lead: Moa Nilsson	Arizona State, Tempe; Minnesota State, Mankato Skip: Andie McDonald; Third: Teagan Thurston; Second: Abby Lin; Lead: Riley Samarzja; Alternate: Addison Neill

=== Round-robin standings ===
Final Round Robin Standings

Key
Teams to Playoffs

Country	Skip	W	L	W–L	PF	PA	EW	EL	BE	SE	DSC
South Korea	Kang Bo-bae	8	1	–	61	35	32	25	3	13	39.16
Japan	Yuina Miura	7	2	1–0	69	32	35	23	3	14	46.96
Canada	Serena Gray-Withers	7	2	0–1	62	29	36	22	1	11	40.99
Norway	Torild Bjørnstad	6	3	–	55	36	29	27	6	7	23.89
China	Pei Junhang	5	4	–	51	41	34	30	1	13	38.00
Sweden	Moa Dryburgh	4	5	1–0	58	56	32	32	2	6	44.90
Great Britain	Laura Watt	4	5	0–1	46	53	29	34	4	8	51.85
Italy	Camilla Gilberti	2	7	1–0	35	71	24	34	0	7	74.98
United States	Andie McDonald	2	7	0–1	38	76	28	35	1	8	71.16
Poland	Julia Dyderska	0	9	–	34	80	22	38	2	4	60.28

Round Robin Summary Table
Pos.	Country	Canada	China	Great Britain	Italy	Japan	Norway	Poland	South Korea	Sweden	United States	Record
3	Canada	—N/a	6–3	11–1	8–3	5–6	3–5	9–1	7–4	5–2	8–4	7–2
5	China	3–6	—N/a	8–7	8–1	4–6	4–3	8–2	4–5	7–5	5–6	5–4
7	Great Britain	1–11	7–8	—N/a	5–2	6–3	3–6	7–4	3–6	6–9	8–4	4–5
8	Italy	3–8	1–8	2–5	—N/a	4–9	1–11	7–5	3–12	4–8	10–5	2–7
2	Japan	6–5	6–4	3–6	9–4	—N/a	10–2	12–3	2–4	9–1	12–3	7–2
4	Norway	5–3	3–4	6–3	11–1	2–10	—N/a	8–2	4–5	8–7	8–1	6–3
10	Poland	1–9	2–8	4–7	5–7	3–12	2–8	—N/a	3–12	7–9	7–8	0–9
1	South Korea	4–7	5–4	6–3	12–3	4–2	5–4	12–3	—N/a	7–5	6–4	8–1
6	Sweden	2–5	5–7	9–6	8–4	1–9	7–8	9–7	5–7	—N/a	12–3	4–5
9	United States	4–8	6–5	4–8	5–10	3–12	1–8	8–7	4–6	3–12	—N/a	2–7

=== Round-robin results ===
All draw times are listed in Central European Time (UTC+01:00).

==== Draw 1 ====
Thursday, January 16, 9:00

Sheet A	1	2	3	4	5	6	7	8	Final
Poland (Dyderska)	0	1	0	0	0	0	0	X	1
Canada (Gray-Withers) 🔨	1	0	2	2	2	1	1	X	9

Sheet B	1	2	3	4	5	6	7	8	Final
United States (McDonald) 🔨	1	1	0	0	1	1	0	2	6
China (Pei)	0	0	1	1	0	0	3	0	5

Sheet C	1	2	3	4	5	6	7	8	Final
Norway (Bjørnstad)	0	0	2	0	0	0	X	X	2
Japan (Miura) 🔨	2	1	0	3	3	1	X	X	10

Sheet D	1	2	3	4	5	6	7	8	Final
Great Britain (Watt) 🔨	0	0	2	0	0	0	1	X	3
South Korea (Kang)	0	1	0	3	1	1	0	X	6

Sheet E	1	2	3	4	5	6	7	8	Final
Italy (Gilberti)	0	1	0	0	0	2	1	X	4
Sweden (Dryburgh) 🔨	2	0	1	3	2	0	0	X	8

==== Draw 2 ====
Thursday, January 16, 19:00

Sheet A	1	2	3	4	5	6	7	8	Final
China (Pei) 🔨	1	2	0	0	1	0	1	3	8
Great Britain (Watt)	0	0	3	2	0	2	0	0	7

Sheet B	1	2	3	4	5	6	7	8	Final
Canada (Gray-Withers)	0	1	0	2	0	0	3	1	7
South Korea (Kang) 🔨	1	0	2	0	0	1	0	0	4

Sheet C	1	2	3	4	5	6	7	8	Final
Italy (Gilberti)	1	0	3	0	0	2	1	X	7
Poland (Dyderska) 🔨	0	1	0	1	3	0	0	X	5

Sheet D	1	2	3	4	5	6	7	8	Final
Sweden (Dryburgh) 🔨	0	0	0	1	0	0	X	X	1
Japan (Miura)	2	1	2	0	3	1	X	X	9

Sheet E	1	2	3	4	5	6	7	8	Final
United States (McDonald)	0	0	0	0	0	1	0	X	1
Norway (Bjørnstad) 🔨	1	1	1	1	2	0	2	X	8

==== Draw 3 ====
Friday, January 17, 12:00

Sheet A	1	2	3	4	5	6	7	8	Final
Japan (Miura)	4	0	1	0	0	2	5	X	12
United States (McDonald) 🔨	0	1	0	1	1	0	0	X	3

Sheet B	1	2	3	4	5	6	7	8	Final
Poland (Dyderska)	0	2	1	0	3	0	1	0	7
Sweden (Dryburgh) 🔨	3	0	0	2	0	2	0	2	9

Sheet C	1	2	3	4	5	6	7	8	Final
Canada (Gray-Withers) 🔨	4	1	3	1	0	2	X	X	11
Great Britain (Watt)	0	0	0	0	1	0	X	X	1

Sheet D	1	2	3	4	5	6	7	8	Final
Norway (Bjørnstad) 🔨	0	4	1	2	0	4	X	X	11
Italy (Gilberti)	0	0	0	0	1	0	X	X	1

Sheet E	1	2	3	4	5	6	7	8	Final
China (Pei)	0	0	1	2	1	0	0	0	4
South Korea (Kang) 🔨	0	1	0	0	0	3	0	1	5

==== Draw 4 ====
Friday, January 17, 20:00

Sheet A	1	2	3	4	5	6	7	8	Final
South Korea (Kang) 🔨	3	4	1	0	4	0	X	X	12
Italy (Gilberti)	0	0	0	1	0	2	X	X	3

Sheet B	1	2	3	4	5	6	7	8	Final
Norway (Bjørnstad)	1	0	2	0	1	0	2	X	6
Great Britain (Watt) 🔨	0	1	0	1	0	1	0	X	3

Sheet C	1	2	3	4	5	6	7	8	Final
Sweden (Dryburgh)	2	0	1	0	1	0	0	1	5
China (Pei) 🔨	0	2	0	1	0	3	1	0	7

Sheet D	1	2	3	4	5	6	7	8	Final
Japan (Miura) 🔨	4	0	1	4	0	3	X	X	12
Poland (Dyderska)	0	2	0	0	1	0	X	X	3

Sheet E	1	2	3	4	5	6	7	8	Final
Canada (Gray-Withers) 🔨	3	0	2	0	1	0	2	X	8
United States (McDonald)	0	2	0	1	0	1	0	X	4

==== Draw 5 ====
Saturday, January 18, 14:00

Sheet A	1	2	3	4	5	6	7	8	9	Final
Norway (Bjørnstad)	0	0	0	1	0	1	0	1	0	3
China (Pei) 🔨	1	0	0	0	1	0	1	0	1	4

Sheet B	1	2	3	4	5	6	7	8	Final
Italy (Gilberti)	0	1	0	1	0	0	1	X	3
Canada (Gray-Withers) 🔨	2	0	2	0	3	1	0	X	8

Sheet C	1	2	3	4	5	6	7	8	Final
Poland (Dyderska)	0	0	1	2	0	0	X	X	3
South Korea (Kang) 🔨	5	3	0	0	2	2	X	X	12

Sheet D	1	2	3	4	5	6	7	8	Final
United States (McDonald)	0	2	0	0	1	0	X	X	3
Sweden (Dryburgh) 🔨	4	0	2	2	0	4	X	X	12

Sheet E	1	2	3	4	5	6	7	8	Final
Great Britain (Watt) 🔨	1	0	1	0	2	0	2	X	6
Japan (Miura)	0	2	0	0	0	1	0	X	3

==== Draw 6 ====
Sunday, January 19, 8:00

Sheet A	1	2	3	4	5	6	7	8	Final
Italy (Gilberti)	0	3	1	0	0	0	0	X	4
Japan (Miura) 🔨	2	0	0	2	1	1	3	X	9

Sheet B	1	2	3	4	5	6	7	8	Final
China (Pei)	2	1	2	0	3	0	X	X	8
Poland (Dyderska) 🔨	0	0	0	1	0	1	X	X	2

Sheet C	1	2	3	4	5	6	7	8	Final
Great Britain (Watt) 🔨	3	0	0	0	0	2	0	3	8
United States (McDonald)	0	1	1	0	1	0	1	0	4

Sheet D	1	2	3	4	5	6	7	8	Final
South Korea (Kang)	1	0	0	2	0	2	0	0	5
Norway (Bjørnstad) 🔨	0	1	0	0	2	0	0	1	4

Sheet E	1	2	3	4	5	6	7	8	Final
Sweden (Dryburgh)	0	1	0	0	0	0	1	X	2
Canada (Gray-Withers) 🔨	3	0	1	0	1	0	0	X	5

==== Draw 7 ====
Sunday, January 19, 16:00

Sheet A	1	2	3	4	5	6	7	8	Final
United States (McDonald)	1	0	2	0	1	0	0	X	4
South Korea (Kang) 🔨	0	3	0	2	0	1	0	X	6

Sheet B	1	2	3	4	5	6	7	8	Final
Sweden (Dryburgh)	0	2	0	1	0	2	1	1	7
Norway (Bjørnstad) 🔨	2	0	3	0	3	0	0	0	8

Sheet C	1	2	3	4	5	6	7	8	Final
Japan (Miura) 🔨	0	2	0	2	0	2	0	0	6
Canada (Gray-Withers)	0	0	1	0	2	0	2	0	5

Sheet D	1	2	3	4	5	6	7	8	Final
Italy (Gilberti)	0	0	1	0	0	0	X	X	1
China (Pei) 🔨	1	1	0	4	1	1	X	X	8

Sheet E	1	2	3	4	5	6	7	8	Final
Poland (Dyderska) 🔨	0	0	0	1	0	2	1	0	4
Great Britain (Watt)	1	2	1	0	2	0	0	1	7

==== Draw 8 ====
Monday, January 20, 9:00

Sheet A	1	2	3	4	5	6	7	8	Final
Canada (Gray-Withers)	0	0	1	1	0	0	1	0	3
Norway (Bjørnstad) 🔨	0	1	0	0	2	0	0	2	5

Sheet B	1	2	3	4	5	6	7	8	Final
Great Britain (Watt) 🔨	0	2	0	1	1	0	1	X	5
Italy (Gilberti)	0	0	1	0	0	1	0	X	2

Sheet C	1	2	3	4	5	6	7	8	Final
South Korea (Kang)	1	0	3	0	2	0	1	0	7
Sweden (Dryburgh) 🔨	0	2	0	1	0	1	0	1	5

Sheet D	1	2	3	4	5	6	7	8	9	Final
Poland (Dyderska) 🔨	2	0	4	0	0	1	0	0	0	7
United States (McDonald)	0	2	0	3	0	0	1	1	1	8

Sheet E	1	2	3	4	5	6	7	8	Final
Japan (Miura) 🔨	1	2	0	1	0	1	0	1	6
China (Pei)	0	0	1	0	1	0	2	0	4

==== Draw 9 ====
Monday, January 20, 19:00

Sheet A	1	2	3	4	5	6	7	8	Final
Great Britain (Watt)	0	0	2	1	0	1	2	0	6
Sweden (Dryburgh) 🔨	2	1	0	0	5	0	0	1	9

Sheet B	1	2	3	4	5	6	7	8	Final
South Korea (Kang)	0	1	1	0	1	1	0	X	4
Japan (Miura) 🔨	0	0	0	1	0	0	1	X	2

Sheet C	1	2	3	4	5	6	7	8	Final
United States (McDonald) 🔨	1	0	0	4	0	0	0	X	5
Italy (Gilberti)	0	3	1	0	2	3	1	X	10

Sheet D	1	2	3	4	5	6	7	8	Final
China (Pei)	0	1	0	0	1	1	0	X	3
Canada (Gray-Withers) 🔨	1	0	3	1	0	0	1	X	6

Sheet E	1	2	3	4	5	6	7	8	Final
Norway (Bjørnstad) 🔨	0	4	0	4	0	0	X	X	8
Poland (Dyderska)	0	0	1	0	0	1	X	X	2

=== Playoffs ===
Semifinals
1	South Korea	6
4	Norway	4
2	Japan	6
3	Canada	5

Final
1	South Korea	5
2	Japan	7
Bronze medal game
4	Norway	3
3	Canada	7

==== Semifinals ====
Tuesday, January 21, 16:00

Sheet C	1	2	3	4	5	6	7	8	9	Final
South Korea (Kang) 🔨	0	1	0	0	2	0	0	1	2	6
Norway (Bjørnstad)	1	0	0	2	0	1	0	0	0	4

Player percentages
South Korea		Norway	
Kim Ji-soo	78%	Eirin Mesloe	82%
Shim Yu-jeong	68%	Ingeborg Forbregd	74%
Kim Min-seo	92%	Nora Østgård	93%
Kang Bo-bae	74%	Torild Bjørnstad	85%
Total	78%	Total	83%

Tuesday, January 21, 20:00

Sheet C	1	2	3	4	5	6	7	8	Final
Japan (Miura) 🔨	1	0	1	0	2	0	2	0	6
Canada (Gray-Withers)	0	1	0	1	0	1	0	2	5

Player percentages
Japan		Canada	
Ai Matsunaga	75%	Zoe Cinnamon	86%
Eri Ogihara	84%	Brianna Cullen	75%
Kohane Tsuruga	72%	Catherine Clifford	77%
Yuina Miura	80%	Serena Gray-Withers	67%
Total	78%	Total	76%

==== Bronze medal game ====
Wednesday, January 22, 14:00

Team	1	2	3	4	5	6	7	8	Final
Norway (Bjørnstad)	0	0	1	0	1	0	1	X	3
Canada (Gray-Withers) 🔨	1	2	0	3	0	1	0	X	7

Player percentages
Norway		Canada	
Eirin Mesloe	79%	Zoe Cinnamon	93%
Ingeborg Forbregd	73%	Brianna Cullen	79%
Nora Østgård	82%	Catherine Clifford	88%
Torild Bjørnstad	57%	Serena Gray-Withers	81%
Total	73%	Total	85%

==== Final ====
Thursday, January 23, 10:00

Team	1	2	3	4	5	6	7	8	9	Final
South Korea (Kang) 🔨	0	0	2	1	0	1	0	1	0	5
Japan (Miura)	0	2	0	0	1	0	2	0	2	7

Player percentages
South Korea		Japan	
Kim Ji-soo	94%	Ai Matsunaga	88%
Shim Yu-jeong	83%	Eri Ogihara	88%
Kim Min-seo	90%	Kohane Tsuruga	85%
Kang Bo-bae	79%	Yuina Miura	94%
Total	87%	Total	89%

=== Final standings ===
Place	Team
1st place, gold medalist(s)	Japan
2nd place, silver medalist(s)	South Korea
3rd place, bronze medalist(s)	Canada
4	Norway
5	China
6	Sweden
7	Great Britain
8	Italy
9	United States
10	Poland

== Mixed Doubles ==
=== Teams ===
The teams are listed as follows:

Canada	Germany	Great Britain	Italy
University of Waterloo, Waterloo; Brock University, St. Catharines Female: Jessica Zheng; Male: Victor Pietrangelo	Technical University of Munich, Munich; Hochschule Kempten, Kempten Female: Kim Sutor; Male: Klaudius Harsch	University of Strathclyde, Glasgow; Dumfries and Galloway College, Dumfries Female: Robyn Munro; Male: Orrin Carson	Universitas Mercatorum, Rome; Unipegaso, Naples Female: Giulia Zardini Lacedelli; Male: Francesco de Zanna
Japan	Norway	Switzerland	United States
Waseda University, Shinjuku; Sapporo International University, Kiyota Female: Yui Ozeki; Male: Taiki Kudo	INN University, Innlandet; NTNU, Trondheim Female: Eilin Kjærland; Male: Eskil Åsmul Eriksen	FHNW School of Education, Solothurn; University of Lausanne, Lausanne Female: Nadine Bärtschiger; Male: Matthieu Fague	College of St. Scholastica, Duluth; DeVry University, Lisle Female: Sara Olson; Male: Coleman Thurston

=== Round-robin standings ===
Final Round Robin Standings

Key
Teams to Playoffs

Country	Athletes	W	L	W–L	PF	PA	EW	EL	BE	SE	DSC
Great Britain	Robyn Munro / Orrin Carson	6	1	1–0	51	41	29	23	0	11	39.56
Canada	Jessica Zheng / Victor Pietrangelo	6	1	0–1	57	32	29	21	0	11	32.35
Germany	Kim Sutor / Klaudius Harsch	5	2	–	49	36	32	20	0	15	35.81
Italy	Giulia Zardini Lacedelli / Francesco de Zanna	4	3	–	45	44	26	24	1	9	34.47
Japan	Yui Ozeki / Taiki Kudo	3	4	–	41	46	22	32	0	8	58.63
Switzerland	Nadine Bärtschiger / Matthieu Fague	2	5	–	43	57	24	29	0	4	42.62
United States	Sara Olson / Coleman Thurston	1	6	1–0	42	52	24	29	0	7	58.60
Norway	Eilin Kjærland / Eskil Åsmul Eriksen	1	6	0–1	34	54	22	30	0	8	43.33

Round Robin Summary Table
Pos.	Country	Canada	Germany	Great Britain	Italy	Japan	Norway	Switzerland	United States	Record
2	Canada	—N/a	9–4	6–7	10–4	7–3	9–4	9–4	7–6	6–1
3	Germany	4–9	—N/a	10–4	6–5	7–4	4–6	10–5	8–3	5–2
1	Great Britain	7–6	4–10	—N/a	9–3	9–6	7–5	8–5	7–6	5–1
4	Italy	4–10	5–6	3–9	—N/a	8–4	8–4	8–5	9–6	4–3
5	Japan	3–7	4–7	6–9	4–8	—N/a	8–5	9–7	7–3	3–4
8	Norway	4–9	6–4	5–7	4–8	5–8	—N/a	5–8	5–10	1–6
6	Switzerland	4–9	5–10	5–8	5–8	7–9	8–5	—N/a	9–8	2–5
7	United States	6–7	3–8	6–7	6–9	3–7	10–5	8–9	—N/a	1–6

=== Round-robin results ===
All draw times are listed in Central European Time (UTC+01:00).

==== Draw 1 ====
Saturday, January 11, 15:00

Sheet A	1	2	3	4	5	6	7	8	Final
Switzerland (Bärtschiger / Fague) 🔨	1	0	0	4	1	0	0	1	7
Japan (Ozeki / Kudo)	0	1	3	0	0	3	2	0	9

Sheet B	1	2	3	4	5	6	7	8	Final
United States (Olson / Thurston) 🔨	1	0	1	0	1	0	3	0	6
Great Britain (Munro / Carson)	0	3	0	1	0	1	0	2	7

Sheet C	1	2	3	4	5	6	7	8	9	Final
Germany (Sutor / Harsch)	0	1	2	0	1	1	0	0	1	6
Italy (Zardini Lacedelli / de Zanna) 🔨	1	0	0	3	0	0	0	1	0	5

Sheet D	1	2	3	4	5	6	7	8	Final
Norway (Kjærland / Eriksen)	1	0	1	2	0	0	0	X	4
Canada (Zheng / Pietrangelo) 🔨	0	3	0	0	2	2	2	X	9

==== Draw 2 ====
Saturday, January 11, 19:00

Sheet A	1	2	3	4	5	6	7	8	Final
Canada (Zheng / Pietrangelo) 🔨	1	0	2	2	0	0	0	2	7
United States (Olson / Thurston)	0	3	0	0	1	1	1	0	6

Sheet B	1	2	3	4	5	6	7	8	Final
Italy (Zardini Lacedelli / de Zanna) 🔨	1	0	3	2	0	1	1	X	8
Norway (Kjærland / Eriksen)	0	3	0	0	1	0	0	X	4

Sheet C	1	2	3	4	5	6	7	8	Final
Great Britain (Munro / Carson)	1	0	2	3	0	2	0	X	8
Switzerland (Bärtschiger / Fague) 🔨	0	1	0	0	3	0	1	X	5

Sheet D	1	2	3	4	5	6	7	8	Final
Japan (Ozeki / Kudo) 🔨	1	1	0	2	0	0	0	0	4
Germany (Sutor / Harsch)	0	0	2	0	1	1	2	1	7

==== Draw 3 ====
Sunday, January 12, 10:00

Sheet A	1	2	3	4	5	6	7	8	Final
United States (Olson / Thurston)	0	0	2	2	0	0	2	X	6
Italy (Zardini Lacedelli / de Zanna) 🔨	4	2	0	0	2	1	0	X	9

Sheet B	1	2	3	4	5	6	7	8	Final
Switzerland (Bärtschiger / Fague) 🔨	1	0	1	0	2	0	0	X	4
Canada (Zheng / Pietrangelo)	0	3	0	4	0	1	1	X	9

Sheet C	1	2	3	4	5	6	7	8	Final
Norway (Kjærland / Eriksen) 🔨	2	1	1	0	0	0	1	X	5
Japan (Ozeki / Kudo)	0	0	0	2	2	4	0	X	8

Sheet D	1	2	3	4	5	6	7	8	Final
Germany (Sutor / Harsch) 🔨	1	2	2	0	1	0	4	X	10
Great Britain (Munro / Carson)	0	0	0	3	0	1	0	X	4

==== Draw 4 ====
Sunday, January 12, 14:00

Sheet A	1	2	3	4	5	6	7	8	Final
Norway (Kjærland / Eriksen) 🔨	0	2	0	0	0	1	1	2	6
Germany (Sutor / Harsch)	1	0	1	1	1	0	0	0	4

Sheet B	1	2	3	4	5	6	7	8	Final
Japan (Ozeki / Kudo) 🔨	1	0	1	0	0	2	0	0	4
Italy (Zardini Lacedelli / de Zanna)	0	3	0	1	1	0	1	2	8

Sheet C	1	2	3	4	5	6	7	8	Final
Canada (Zheng / Pietrangelo)	2	0	0	1	0	2	0	1	6
Great Britain (Munro / Carson) 🔨	0	2	1	0	1	0	3	0	7

Sheet D	1	2	3	4	5	6	7	8	Final
Switzerland (Bärtschiger / Fague)	0	0	6	0	1	1	0	1	9
United States (Olson / Thurston) 🔨	4	2	0	1	0	0	1	0	8

==== Draw 5 ====
Sunday, January 12, 18:00

Sheet A	1	2	3	4	5	6	7	8	Final
Italy (Zardini Lacedelli / de Zanna) 🔨	1	0	0	0	0	2	0	X	3
Great Britain (Munro / Carson)	0	2	1	1	1	0	4	X	9

Sheet B	1	2	3	4	5	6	7	8	Final
Norway (Kjærland / Eriksen)	0	1	2	0	0	2	0	0	5
Switzerland (Bärtschiger / Fague) 🔨	1	0	0	2	1	0	3	1	8

Sheet C	1	2	3	4	5	6	7	8	Final
United States (Olson / Thurston)	0	0	1	0	0	2	0	X	3
Germany (Sutor / Harsch) 🔨	1	2	0	1	1	0	3	X	8

Sheet D	1	2	3	4	5	6	7	8	Final
Canada (Zheng / Pietrangelo) 🔨	2	0	1	0	1	2	1	X	7
Japan (Ozeki / Kudo)	0	1	0	2	0	0	0	X	3

==== Draw 6 ====
Monday, January 13, 10:00

Sheet A	1	2	3	4	5	6	7	8	Final
Germany (Sutor / Harsch) 🔨	3	0	1	2	1	0	3	X	10
Switzerland (Bärtschiger / Fague)	0	4	0	0	0	1	0	X	5

Sheet B	1	2	3	4	5	6	7	8	Final
Great Britain (Munro / Carson) 🔨	2	0	0	1	3	2	1	X	9
Japan (Ozeki / Kudo)	0	5	1	0	0	0	0	X	6

Sheet C	1	2	3	4	5	6	7	8	Final
Italy (Zardini Lacedelli / de Zanna) 🔨	3	0	0	0	1	0	X	X	4
Canada (Zheng / Pietrangelo)	0	2	2	1	0	5	X	X	10

Sheet D	1	2	3	4	5	6	7	8	Final
United States (Olson / Thurston) 🔨	2	1	0	6	1	0	0	X	10
Norway (Kjærland / Eriksen)	0	0	2	0	0	2	1	X	5

==== Draw 7 ====
Monday, January 13, 14:00

Sheet A	1	2	3	4	5	6	7	8	Final
Great Britain (Munro / Carson)	0	1	1	0	2	0	2	1	7
Norway (Kjærland / Eriksen) 🔨	1	0	0	2	0	2	0	0	5

Sheet B	1	2	3	4	5	6	7	8	Final
Canada (Zheng / Pietrangelo)	2	3	0	0	2	0	2	X	9
Germany (Sutor / Harsch) 🔨	0	0	2	1	0	1	0	X	4

Sheet C	1	2	3	4	5	6	7	8	Final
Japan (Ozeki / Kudo) 🔨	1	1	0	0	3	0	1	1	7
United States (Olson / Thurston)	0	0	1	1	0	1	0	0	3

Sheet D	1	2	3	4	5	6	7	8	Final
Italy (Zardini Lacedelli / de Zanna) 🔨	1	2	1	0	3	0	1	X	8
Switzerland (Bärtschiger / Fague)	0	0	0	3	0	2	0	X	5

=== Playoffs ===
Semifinals
1	Great Britain	6
4	Italy	3
2	Canada	5
3	Germany	7

Gold medal game
1	Great Britain	10
3	Germany	8
Bronze medal game
4	Italy	3
2	Canada	9

==== Semifinals ====
Tuesday, January 14, 9:00

Team	1	2	3	4	5	6	7	8	Final
Canada (Zheng / Pietrangelo) 🔨	2	1	0	0	1	0	0	1	5
Germany (Sutor / Harsch)	0	0	2	1	0	1	3	0	7

Player percentages
Canada		Germany	
Jessica Zheng	62%	Kim Sutor	63%
Victor Pietrangelo	78%	Klaudius Harsch	88%
Total	72%	Total	72%

Tuesday, January 14, 13:00

Team	1	2	3	4	5	6	7	8	Final
Great Britain (Munro / Carson) 🔨	1	0	1	1	0	0	3	X	6
Italy (Zardini Lacedelli / de Zanna)	0	1	0	0	1	1	0	X	3

Player percentages
Great Britain		Italy	
Robyn Munro	72%	Giulia Zardini Lacedelli	68%
Orrin Carson	76%	Francesco de Zanna	75%
Total	74%	Total	72%

==== Bronze medal game ====
Tuesday, January 14, 17:00

Team	1	2	3	4	5	6	7	8	Final
Italy (Zardini Lacedelli / de Zanna)	0	0	0	2	0	1	0	X	3
Canada (Zheng / Pietrangelo) 🔨	2	2	1	0	3	0	1	X	9

Player percentages
Italy		Canada	
Giulia Zardini Lacedelli	66%	Jessica Zheng	86%
Francesco de Zanna	63%	Victor Pietrangelo	86%
Total	64%	Total	86%

==== Gold medal game ====
Tuesday, January 14, 20:00

Team	1	2	3	4	5	6	7	8	Final
Great Britain (Munro / Carson) 🔨	3	1	0	2	0	4	0	X	10
Germany (Sutor / Harsch)	0	0	4	0	2	0	2	X	8

Player percentages
Great Britain		Germany	
Robyn Munro	75%	Kim Sutor	77%
Orrin Carson	79%	Klaudius Harsch	74%
Total	78%	Total	75%

=== Final standings ===
Place	Team
1st place, gold medalist(s)	Great Britain
2nd place, silver medalist(s)	Germany
3rd place, bronze medalist(s)	Canada
4	Italy
5	Japan
6	Switzerland
7	United States
8	Norway
