= Estonia at the 2025 Winter World University Games =

- IOC code: EST
- NOC: Estonian Academic Sports Federation

in Turin, Italy 13 January 2025 – 23 January 2025
- Competitors: 14 (8 men and 6 women) in 7 sports
- Medals Ranked 17th: Gold 1 Silver 3 Bronze 0 Total 4

Winter Universiade appearances (overview)
- 1997; 1999; 2001; 2003; 2005; 2007; 2009; 2011; 2013; 2015; 2017; 2019; 2023; 2025

Estonia competed at the 2025 Winter World University Games in Turin, Italy, from 13 to 23 January 2025.

== Medalists ==
Estonia finished on the seventeenth place in the medal table with four medals.

Medal	Name	Sport	Event	Date
Gold	Keidy Kaasiku	Cross-country skiing	Women's 20km mass start classic	23 January
Silver	Kaidy Kaasiku	Cross-country skiing	Women's sprint classic	17 January
Silver	Stefan Sorokin	Freestyle skiing	Men's freeski slopestyle	17 January
Silver	Kaidy Kaasiku	Cross-country skiing	Women's 20km mass start classic	23 January

== Competitors ==
At the 2025 Winter World University Games was participated 14 athletes.

Sport	Men	Women	Total
Alpine skiing	1	0	1
Biathlon	0	1	1
Cross-country skiing	2	2	4
Figure skating	2	2	4
Freestyle skiing	2	0	2
Ski orienteering	1	1	2
Total	8	6	14
