= Switzerland at the 2025 Winter World University Games =

- IOC code: SUI
- NOC: Swiss University Sports

in Turin, Italy 13 January 2025 – 23 January 2025
- Competitors: 38 in 4 sports
- Flag bearers: Matthieu Fargue, Nadine Bärtschiger
- Medals Ranked 9th: Gold 4 Silver 5 Bronze 5 Total 14

Winter Universiade appearances
- 1960; 1962; 1964; 1966; 1968; 1972; 1978; 1981; 1983; 1985; 1987; 1989; 1991; 1993; 1995; 1997; 1999; 2001; 2003; 2005; 2007; 2009; 2011; 2013; 2015; 2017; 2019; 2023; 2025

Switzerland competed at the 2025 Winter World University Games in Turin, Italy, from 13 to 23 January 2025.

== Medalists ==
Switzerland finished on the ninth place in the medal table with 14 medals.

Medal	Name	Sport	Event	Date
Gold	Loïc Chable	Alpine skiing	Men's alpine combined	16 January
Gold	Nolan Gertsch	Cross-country skiing	Men's sprint classic	17 January
Gold	Sue Piller	Alpine skiing	Women's giant slalom	18 January
Gold	Sue Piller	Alpine skiing	Women's slalom	21 January
Silver	Delphine Darbellay	Alpine skiing	Women's giant slalom	18 January
Silver	Loïc Chable	Alpine skiing	Men's giant slalom	19 January
Silver	Sue Piller; Gino Stucki; Mathilde Phillips; Löic Chable	Alpine skiing	Mixed team parallel	20 January
Silver	Amélie Klopfenstein	Alpine skiing	Women's slalom	21 January
Silver	Nolan Gertsch; Silvan Durrer; Maxime Béguin; Jan Fässler	Cross-country skiing	Men's 4 x 7.5km relay	21 January
Bronze	Carla Wohler	Cross-country skiing	Women's 10km individual free	15 January
Bronze	Nick Spörri	Alpine skiing	Men's giant slalom	19 January
Bronze	Delia Giezendanner	Ski orienteering	Women's sprint	19 January
Bronze	Delia Giezendanner; Corsin Boos	Ski orienteering	Mixed sprint relay	21 January
Bronze	Jan Iseli; Maximilian Winz; Dean Hürlimann; Sandro Fanchini	Curling	Men	22 January

== Competitors ==
At the 2025 Winter World University Games was participated 38 athletes. Matthieu Fargue and Nadine Bärtschiger was a flag bearers.

Sport	Men	Women	Total
Alpine skiing	7	8	15
Cross-country skiing	6	5	11
Curling	5	1	6
Ski orienteering	4	2	6
Total	22	16	38
