= 2025 Winter World University Games =

Multi-sport event in Turin, Italy

2025 FISU Winter World University Games Giochi Mondiali Universitari Invernali FISU 2025
- Host city: Turin, Italy
- Motto: Piemonte land of sport, Piemonte terra di sport
- Edition: 32nd
- Teams: 54 NUSFs
- Athletes: 1,503
- Events: 90 in 11 sports
- Opening: 13 January 2025
- Closing: 23 January 2025
- Opened by: Andrea Abodi
- Torch lighter: Giorgio Chiellini
- Main venue: Inalpi Arena (opening); Piazza Castello (closing)
- Website: wugtorino2025.com

The 2025 FISU Winter World University Games, also known as Turin 2025 or Torino 2025, was a multi-sport event for student and youth athletes, held between 13–23 January 2025, in Turin, Italy. The Piedmontese capital was confirmed as the host city for the games on 15 May 2021. This was the 12th time that the World University Games had been held in Italy, the 7th time that the Winter Games were held in Italy, and the 2nd time in the city, as the city previously hosted the 2007 Games. The city is considered the birthplace of the event, as it hosted the first summer Games in 1959 and again in 1970, becoming the first city to host summer and winter editions of the World University Games. If the summer editions are counted, this was the 12th time that the World University Games have been held on Italian soil, as the most recent were the 2019 Games held in Naples.

The 2025 FISU Winter World University Games were the first World University Games event to feature para-athletes competing in para-sport events, alongside the existing able-bodied events, as part of FISU’s long-term strategy of inclusiveness and social sustainability.

== Bidding process ==
On 6 July 2020, representatives from the Metropolitan City of Turin, Piedmont Region, University of Turin, Polytechnic of Turin, CUS Turin, EDISU and University of Eastern Piedmont formally announced their candidature to host the 2025 Winter games. The joint bid, known as "Torino 2025," included for the second time intentions to host parasports events, in tandem with the 2025 World Winter Special Olympics in Piedmont Region. The Italian government's Minister of Sport, Vincenzo Spadafora, confirmed his strong support for the candidature on 7 July 2020. Considered the birthplace of the event, the city has hosted the 1959 and 1970 Summer Universiades, the 2006 Winter Olympics and Paralympics and the 2007 Winter Universiade and has a tradition of hosting international sporting and entertainment events and also hosted the Eurovision Song Contest in 2022. Italy's relationship with university sports also stands out, as Rome hosted the Summer Games in 1975, while Sicily in also hosted the same event 1997 and Naples in more recently in 2019, replacing Brasília as host city. Sestriere was the first Winter Games edition in the same event in 1966 games, with Turin serving as the host city for ice hockey. And just as in 2007, it will be the sub-venue for snow events. Livigno in Sondrio Province, the 1975 Winter Games. In 1985, it was the turn of the resort of Belluno in Veneto. Another resort, Tarvisio in the most northeastern part of the country with neighboring cities in Austria and Slovenia, co-hosted the 2003 winter event. And in 2013 when the province of Trentino replaced Maribor in Slovenia and hosted the event during the bid process for the 2026 Winter Olympics with some venues who were also part of the project.

Despite having begun, negotiations for this edition to be held in Lucerne, Switzerland due to the cancellation of the 2021 Winter Universiade due to the COVID-19 pandemic did not come to fruition, and in addition, there was a joint proposal made by Sweden and Finland, led by Stockholm as main host.

== Venues ==
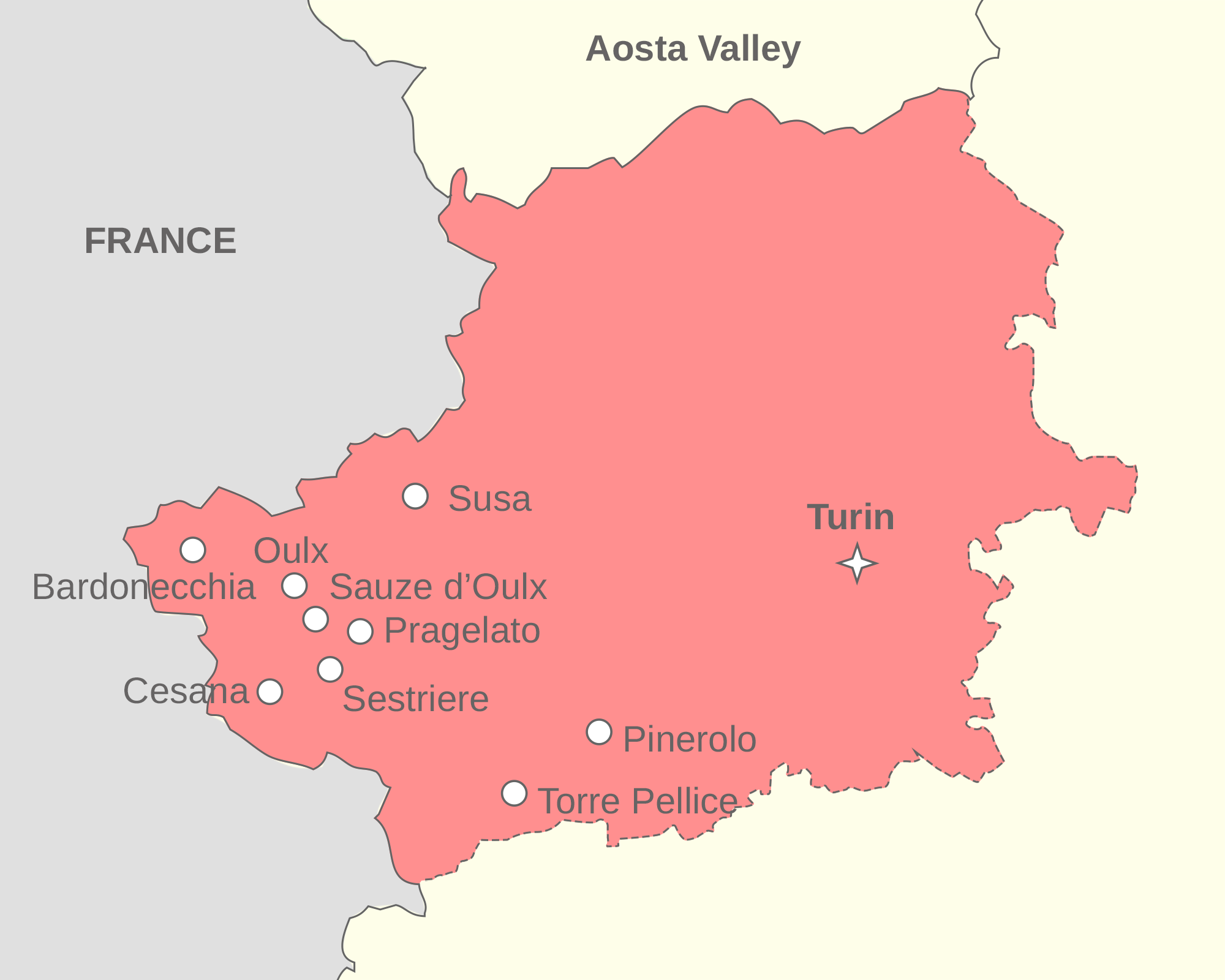
Location of venues

Alongside Turin, six municipalities in the Piedmont region hosted 11 sports:

Venue	City	Sport	Capacity
Inalpi Arena	Turin	Opening Ceremony	16,600
Piazza Castello	Turin	Closing Ceremony	-
Palavela	Turin	Figure skating and short track speed skating	8,285
Palasport Tazzoli	Turin	Ice hockey (finals) and curling	2,290
Pinerolo Palaghiaccio	Pinerolo	Ice hockey	2,000
Palaghiaccio Olimpico	Torre Pellice	Ice hockey	2,370
Pragelato Plan	Pragelato	Biathlon, cross-country skiing and ski orienteering	
Melezet	Bardonecchia	Alpine skiing and snowboarding	
Snowpark Melezet Sellette & Campo Smith 1	Bardonecchia	Freestyle skiing	
Sestriere Colle	Sestriere	Ski mountaineering	

== The Games ==
=== Opening ceremony ===
The opening ceremony was held on Monday, 13 January, at the Inalpi Arena.

=== Sports ===
90 medal events in 11 sports were held during the Games, with the nine compulsory sports along two optional sports: ski mountaineering — which made its World Winter University Games debut, and ski orienteering — which returned for the first time since 2019. These were also the first World Winter University Games to hold parasports events in two sports: alpine skiing and cross-country skiing. FISU confirmed in November 2023 that this proposal was accepted. The mixed doubles event in curling made its debut in these Games.

The numbers in parentheses indicate the number of medal events contested in each sport. This number also considers the parasport events:

- Alpine skiing (21)
- Biathlon (9)
- Cross-country skiing (15)
- Curling (3)
- Figure skating (3)
- Freestyle skiing (10)
- Ice hockey (2)
- Short track speed skating (9)
- Ski orienteering (3)
- Ski mountaineering (5)
- Snowboarding (10)

=== Closing ceremony ===
The closing ceremony was held on Thursday, 23 January, at Piazza Castello.

== Medal table ==
* Host nation (Italy)

Rank	Nation	Gold	Silver	Bronze	Total
1	France	18	8	14	40
2	South Korea	8	6	6	20
3	Finland	8	3	4	15
4	Japan	7	8	4	19
5	Germany	6	9	8	23
6	Poland	6	3	5	14
7	Spain	4	7	2	13
8	Italy*	4	5	6	15
9	Switzerland	4	5	5	14
10	Ukraine	4	4	4	12
11	Slovenia	4	1	1	6
12	Kazakhstan	3	4	7	14
13	Norway	3	1	0	4
14	Sweden	2	7	0	9
15	Austria	2	2	2	6
16	China	1	3	1	5
17	Estonia	1	3	0	4
18	Canada	1	2	6	9
19	Great Britain	1	2	0	3
20	Czech Republic	1	1	3	5
21	Chile	1	1	0	2
22	Bulgaria	1	0	2	3
23	United States	0	1	1	2
24	Netherlands	0	1	0	1
24	Slovakia	0	1	0	1
26	Argentina	0	0	1	1
26	Armenia	0	0	1	1
26	Croatia	0	0	1	1
Totals (28 entries)		90	88	84	262

== Schedule ==
This is the final schedule announced in October 2024.

OC	Opening ceremony	●	Event competitions	1	Event finals	CC	Closing ceremony

January	11 Sat	12 Sun	13 Mon	14 Tue	15 Wed	16 Thu	17 Fri	18 Sat	19 Sun	20 Mon	21 Tue	22 Wed	23 Thu	Events
Ceremonies			OC										CC	
Alpine skiing					1	1	2	1	1	1	1	1		9
Para alpine skiing						6		6						12
Biathlon				2		1		2		2		2		9
Cross-country skiing					2		2		1		2		2	9
Para-cross-country skiing					3		3							6
Curling	●	●	●	1	●	●	●	●	●	●	●	●	2	3
Figure skating						●	1	2						3
Freestyle skiing				2	2	●	2	●	2	●	●	2		10
Ice hockey	●	●	●	●	●	●	●	●	●	1	●	1		2
Short track speed skating											2	3	4	9
Ski mountaineering						2	1		2					5
Ski orienteering									2		1			3
Snowboarding		●	●	2		●	2	●	2		2	2		10
Total events				7	8	10	13	11	10	4	8	11	8	90
Cumulative total				7	15	25	38	49	59	63	71	82	90	90
January	11 Sat	12 Sun	13 Mon	14 Tue	15 Wed	16 Thu	17 Fri	18 Sat	19 Sun	20 Mon	21 Tue	22 Wed	23 Thu	Events

== Participating nations ==
54 National University Sports Federations (NUSFs) registered to compete in the Games.

- Argentina (4)
- Armenia (10)
- Australia (16)
- Austria (24)
- Belgium (8)
- Brazil (4)
- Bulgaria (9)
- Canada (86)
- Chile (7)
- China (48)
- Croatia (5)
- Czech Republic (88)
- Estonia (11)
- Finland (41)
- France (72)
- Georgia (4)
- Germany (67)
- Great Britain (80)
- Hong Kong (14)
- Hungary (19)
- Ireland (3)
- Italy (89) (Hosts)
- Japan (78)
- Kazakhstan (45)
- Kosovo (9)
- Latvia (10)
- Lebanon (1)
- Liechtenstein (3)
- Lithuania (4)
- Luxembourg (2)
- Malaysia (1)
- Mexico (2)
- Mongolia (17)
- Nepal (1)
- Netherlands (8)
- New Zealand (4)
- Norway (33)
- Philippines (1)
- Poland (82)
- Portugal (6)
- Romania (20)
- Singapore (1)
- South Korea (71)
- Slovakia (77)
- Slovenia (9)
- Spain (20)
- Sweden (33)
- Switzerland (51)
- Chinese Taipei(18)
- Thailand (3)
- Turkey (26)
- Ukraine (57)
- United States (87)
