= Poland at the 2025 Winter World University Games =

- IOC code: POL
- NOC: University Sports Association of Poland
- Website: www.azs.pl

in Turin, Italy 13 January 2025 – 23 January 2025
- Competitors: 82 in 12 sports
- Medals Ranked 6th: Gold 6 Silver 3 Bronze 5 Total 14

Winter Universiade appearances
- 1960; 1962; 1964; 1966; 1968; 1972; 1978; 1981; 1983; 1985; 1987; 1989; 1991; 1993; 1995; 1997; 1999; 2001; 2003; 2005; 2007; 2009; 2011; 2013; 2015; 2017; 2019; 2023; 2025

Poland competed at the 2025 Winter World University Games in Turin, Italy, from 13 to 23 January 2025.

== Medalists ==
Medal	Name	Sport	Event	Date
Gold	Izabela Marcisz	Cross-country skiing	Women's 10 km individual free	15 January
Gold	Michał Gołaś	Para-alpine skiing	Men's super-g VI	16 January
Gold	Izabela Marcisz	Cross-country skiing	Women's sprint classic	17 January
Gold	Barbara Skrobiszewska	Biathlon	Women's 7.5 km sprint	18 January
Gold	Michał Gołaś	Para-alpine skiing	Men's giant slalom VI	18 January
Gold	Barbara Skrobiszewska	Biathlon	Women's 10 km pursuit	20 January
Silver	Amelia Liszka	Biathlon	Women's 12.5 km short individual	14 January
Silver	Amelia Liszka	Biathlon	Women's 7.5 km sprint	18 January
Silver	Amelia Liszka	Biathlon	Women's 10 km pursuit	20 January
Bronze	Aneta Kobryń	Para-cross-country skiing	Women's 10 km free	15 January
Bronze	Anna Nędza-Kubiniec; Jakub Potoniec	Biathlon	Single mixed relay	16 January
Bronze	Aneta Kobryń	Para-cross-country skiing	Women's sprint classic	17 January
Bronze	Izabela Marcisz; Łukasz Gazurek	Cross-country skiing	Mixed sprint team	19 January
Bronze	Izabela Marcisz	Cross-country skiing	Women's 20 km mass start classic	23 January

== Competitors ==
At the 2025 Winter World University Games was participated 82 athletes.

Sport	Men	Women	Total
Alpine skiing	3	3	6
Biathlon	5	5	10
Cross-country skiing	5	5	10
Curling	0	5	5
Figure skating	2	3	5
Freestyle skiing	1	0	1
Ice hockey	23	0	23
Para-alpine skiing	1	0	1
Para-cross-country skiing	0	1	1
Short track speed skating	3	4	7
Ski mountaineering	3	2	5
Snowboarding	4	4	8
Total	50	32	82

Athlete	Date of birth	Sport	University	Sex
Jakub Bachleda-Księdzularz	29 July 2001	Ski mountaineering	University of Physical Education in Krakow	M
Magdalena Bańdo	12 January 2005	Alpine skiing	University of Silesia in Katowice	F
Karolina Białas	12 July 2004	Figure skating	VIZJA University	F
Paweł Bryja	31 March 2005	Cross-country skiing	Academy of Physical Education in Katowice	M
Sebastian Bryja	11 February 2002	Cross-country skiing	Academy of Physical Education in Katowice	M
Kacper Brzóska	18 March 2004	Biathlon	Academy of Physical Education in Katowice	M
Dominik Buczek	17 August 2003	Ice hockey	University of Physical Education in Krakow	M
Oliwia Buśko	2 June 2003	Cross-country skiing	Academy of Physical Education in Katowice	F
Wiktoria Celczyńska	25 October 2000	Biathlon	Academy of Physical Education in Katowice	F
Łukasz Długopolski	27 August 2004	Ice hockey	Cracow University of Technology	M
Natalian Dobrzeniecki	10 January 2002	Ice hockey	Nicolaus Copernicus University in Toruń	M
Sofiia Dovhal	8 December 2006	Figure skating	University of Physical Education and Tourism in Pruszkow	F
Stanisław Drozd-Niekurzak	20 February 2002	Ice hockey	Gdansk University of Physical Education and Sport	M
Julia Dyderska	31 July 2002	Curling	SGH Warsaw School of Economics	F
Marlena Dziewirz	11 June 2002	Curling	Academy of Applied Sciences in Wrocław	F
Antoni Dziurdzia	4 December 2000	Ice hockey	AGH University of Krakow	M
Jan Elantkowski	23 August 2000	Ski mountaineering	University of Physical Education in Krakow	M
Paulina Frysz	13 August 2004	Curling	State University of Applied Sciences in Racibórz	F
Łukasz Gazurek	13 July 2003	Cross-country skiing	Academy of Physical Education in Katowice	M
Majka Germata	12 August 2006	Biathlon	Karkonosze University of Applied Sciences	F
Michał Gołaś	7 October 2004	Para-alpine skiing	University of Physical Education in Krakow	M
Paulina Gomola	8 December 2005	Ski mountaineering	Academy of Physical Education in Katowice	F
Brian Gruca	12 August 2005	Ice hockey	Academy of Physical Education in Katowice	M
Michał Jaracz	12 November 2002	Ice hockey	AGH University of Krakow	M
Weronika Jarecka	11 June 2003	Cross-country skiing	Academy of Physical Education in Katowice	F
Jan Jaromin	5 December 2001	Snowboarding	Academy of Physical Education in Katowice	M
Julia Jawień	19 January 2004	Curling	University of Physical Education in Krakow	F
Olga Kaciczak	4 December 2004	Snowboarding	Jagiellonian University	F
Jakub Kafarowski	1 October 2004	Ski mountaineering	European School of Law and Administration	M
Dominik Kasprzyk	26 March 2002	Ice hockey	Academy of Physical Education in Katowice	M
Szymon Klimowski	14 January 2003	Ice hockey	University of Applied Sciences in Nowy Targ	M
Magdalena Kobielusz	8 September 2000	Cross-country skiing	Academy of Physical Education in Katowice	F
Aneta Kobryń	16 August 2000	Para-cross-country skiing	University of Physical Education in Warsaw	F
Aleksandra Kołodziej	14 February 2004	Cross-country skiing	Academy of Physical Education in Katowice	F
Mateusz Kołodziej	7 September 2001	Ice hockey	Academy of Physical Education in Katowice	M
Oliwier Ksiondz	5 October 2001	Ice hockey	WSB Merito University	M
Wiktor Kulesza	28 August 2003	Figure skating	University of Physical Education and Tourism in Pruszkow	M
Olimpia Kwiatkowska	31 January 2000	Snowboarding	University of Physical Education in Krakow	F
Adam Laskowski	29 September 2003	Ice hockey	Gdańsk University of Technology	M
Przemysław Legierski	29 July 2005	Cross-country skiing	Academy of Physical Education in Katowice	M
Amelia Liszka	4 February 2006	Biathlon	University of Physical Education in Krakow	F
Jakub Lofek	3 December 2005	Figure skating	State University of Małopolska in Oświęcim	M
Jakub Luboński	16 March 2001	Snowboarding	AGH University of Krakow	M
Maciej Łapka	16 May 2005	Biathlon	Academy of Physical Education in Katowice	M
Anna Majerczyk	30 December 2004	Ski mountaineering	University of Physical Education in Krakow	F
Ada Majewska	17 April 2004	Short track speed skating	University of Białystok	F
Kacper Malasiński	3 January 2004	Ice hockey	University of Physical Education in Krakow	M
Mateusz Malinowski	11 July 2003	Ice hockey	University of Physical Education in Krakow	M
Izabela Marcisz	18 May 2000	Cross-country skiing	University of Physical Education in Krakow	F
Laura Michalska	27 July 2005	Short track speed skating	WSB Merito University	F
Mateusz Mikołajuk	22 April 2002	Short track speed skating	University of Vocational Education in Wrocław	M
Dawid Miller	20 July 2005	Biathlon	Karkonosze University of Applied Sciences	M
Karol Moś	19 December 2004	Ice hockey	University of Silesia in Katowice	M
Adam Muchlado	30 July 2004	Short track speed skating	University of Białystok	M
Jakub Musioł	4 November 2004	Ice hockey	Academy of Physical Education in Katowice	M
Patryk Napiórkowski	14 March 2004	Ice hockey	Nicolaus Copernicus University in Toruń	M
Anna Nędza-Kubiniec	4 July 2003	Biathlon	Korczak University	F
Krzysztof Owczarek	31 December 2004	Snowboarding	VIZJA University	M
Mariusz Pływaczyk	19 January 2004	Biathlon	Karkonosze University of Applied Sciences	M
Jakub Potoniec	17 June 2005	Biathlon	Karkonosze University of Applied Sciences	M
Igor Ratajczak	8 May 2004	Ice hockey	Academy of Physical Education in Katowice	M
Michał Sadowski	19 July 2001	Ice hockey	Opole University of Technology	M
Aleksander Sakowicz	30 January 2005	Short track speed skating	Bialystok University of Technology	M
Bartłomiej Sanetra	1 June 2002	Alpine skiing	Academy of Physical Education in Katowice	M
Aniela Sawicka	3 January 2001	Alpine skiing	Academy of Physical Education in Katowice	F
Eryk Schafer	21 May 2004	Ice hockey	Nicolaus Copernicus University in Toruń	M
Bartosz Schmidt	18 September 2001	Ice hockey	WSB Merito University	M
Barbara Skrobiszewska	5 January 2003	Biathlon	Academy of Physical Education in Katowice	F
Hanna Sokołowska	3 June 2003	Short track speed skating	East European Academy of Applied Sciences in Białystok	F
Natalia Stokłosa	17 July 2004	Snowboarding	University of Information Technology and Management in Rzeszów	F
Mateusz Szczap	21 April 2005	Alpine skiing	University of Warsaw	M
Laura Szczęsna	24 June 2004	Figure skating	University of Social Sciences	F
Piotr Szelag	7 April 2004	Alpine skiing	East European Academy of Applied Sciences in Białystok	M
Marcin Szlomski	1 June 2004	Ice hockey	University of Economics in Katowice	M
Martyna Szymanowska	7 March 2003	Curling	AGH University of Krakow	F
Tobiasz Szyndler	3 June 2000	Freestyle skiing	Silesian University of Technology	M
Michalina Wawer	3 October 2006	Short track speed skating	East European Academy of Applied Sciences in Białystok	F
Tomasz Wąsowicz	6 September 2004	Cross-country skiing	Academy of Physical Education in Katowice	M
Jakub Wenker	22 June 2002	Ice hockey	Nicolaus Copernicus University in Toruń	M
Michał Wilk	15 June 2004	Snowboarding	University of Rzeszów	M
Sonia Zapała	9 January 2005	Snowboarding	Agricultural University of Kraków	F
Hanna Zięba	30 March 2005	Alpine skiing	Academy of Physical Education in Katowice	F
