= List of Olympic venues in curling =

For the Winter Olympics, there are eleven venues that have been or will be used for curling.

Games	Venue	Other sports hosted at venue for those games	Capacity	Ref.
1924 Chamonix	Stade Olympique de Chamonix	Cross-country skiing, Figure skating, Ice hockey, Military patrol, Nordic combined (cross-country skiing), Speed skating	45,000	
1988 Calgary	Max Bell Arena (demonstration)	Short track speed skating (demonstration)	3,200	
1992 Albertville	Patinoire olympique de Pralognan-la-Vanoise (demonstration)	None	2,300	
1998 Nagano	Kazakoshi Park Arena	None	1,924	
2002 Salt Lake City	The Ice Sheet at Ogden	None	2,000	
2006 Turin	Pinerolo Palaghiaccio	None	2,000	
2010 Vancouver	Vancouver Olympic/Paralympic Centre	None	6,000	
2014 Sochi	Ice Cube Curling Center	None	3,000	
2018 Pyeongchang	Gangneung Curling Centre	None	3,500	
2022 Beijing	Beijing National Aquatics Center	None	4,598	
2026 Milan — Cortina d'Ampezzo	Stadio Olimpico Del Ghiaccio	None	3,100	
2030 French Alps	Eurexpo	None	TBD	
2034 Utah	Salt Palace	None	6,500	

== Gallery of venues ==
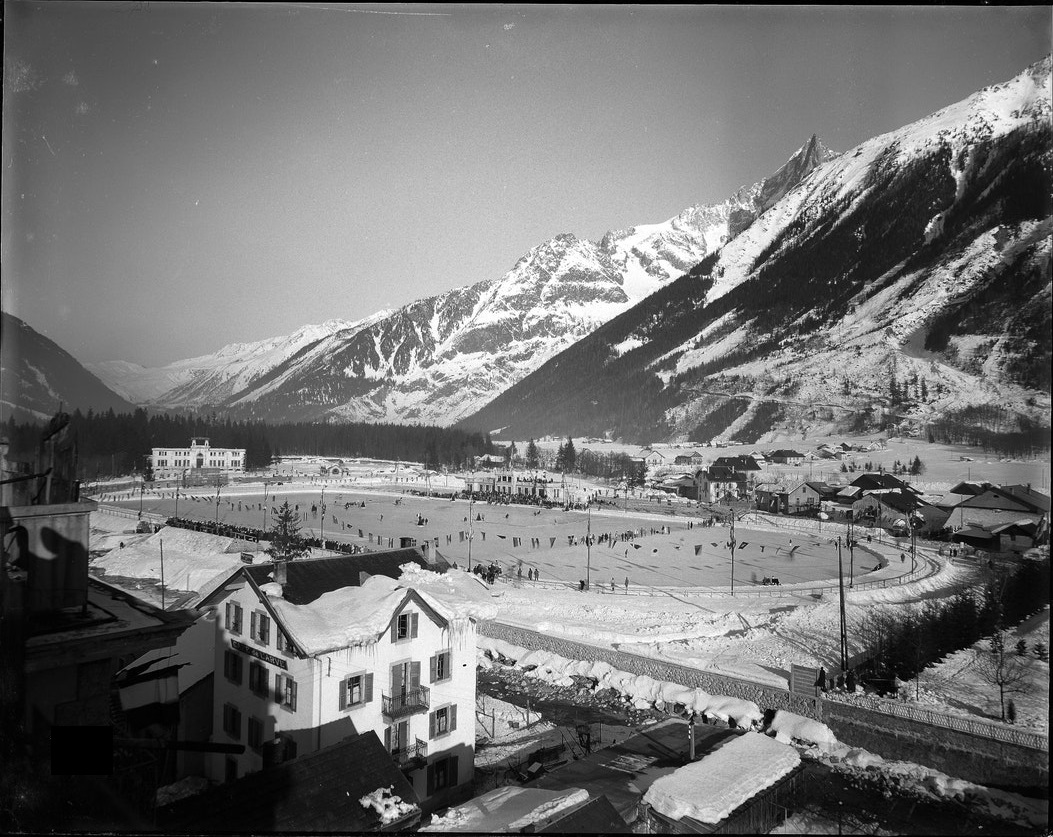
Stade Olympique de Chamonix hosted curling at the 1924 Winter Olympics.

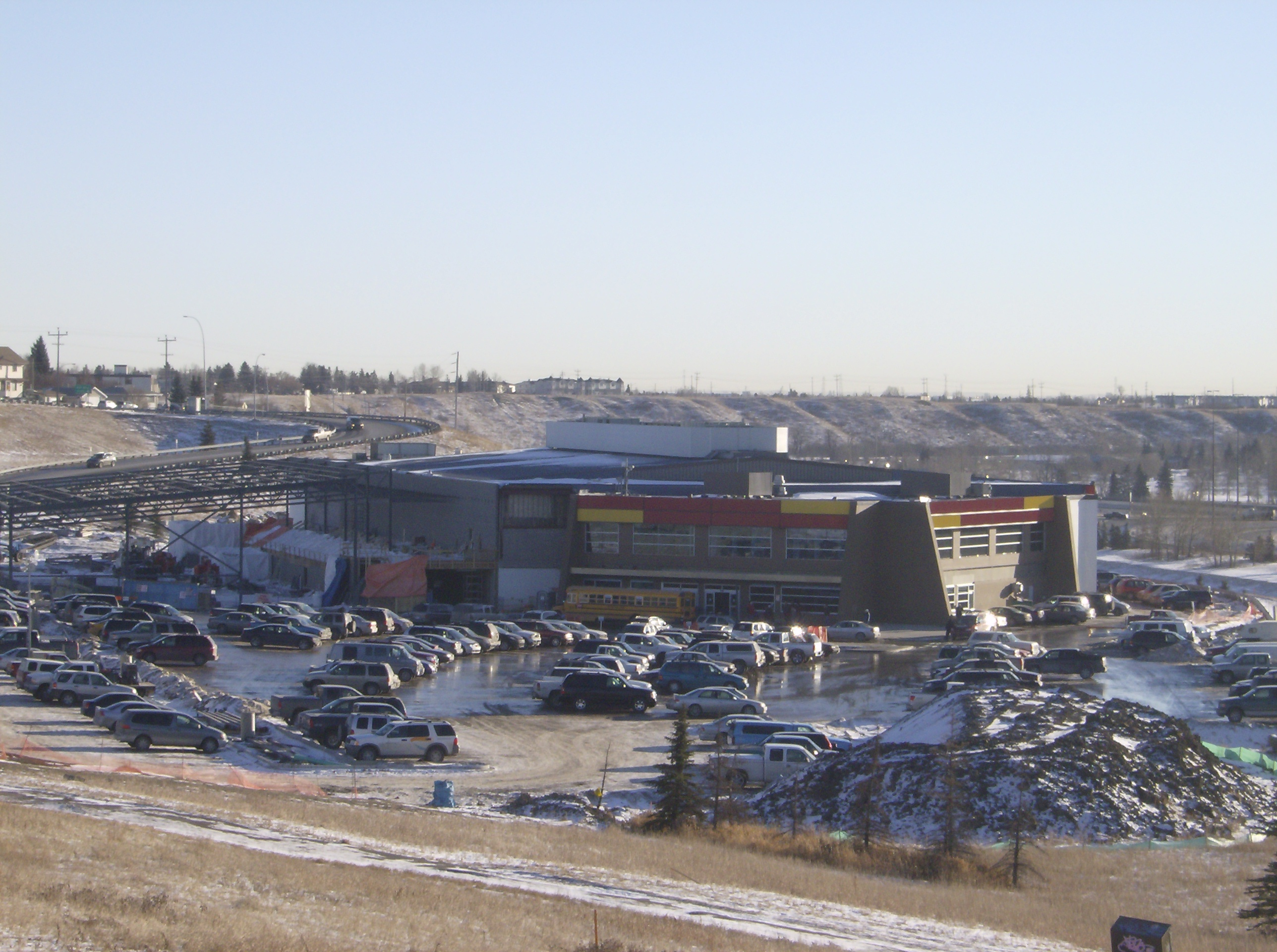
Max Bell Centre hosted curling as a demonstration sport at the 1988 Winter Olympics in Calgary.

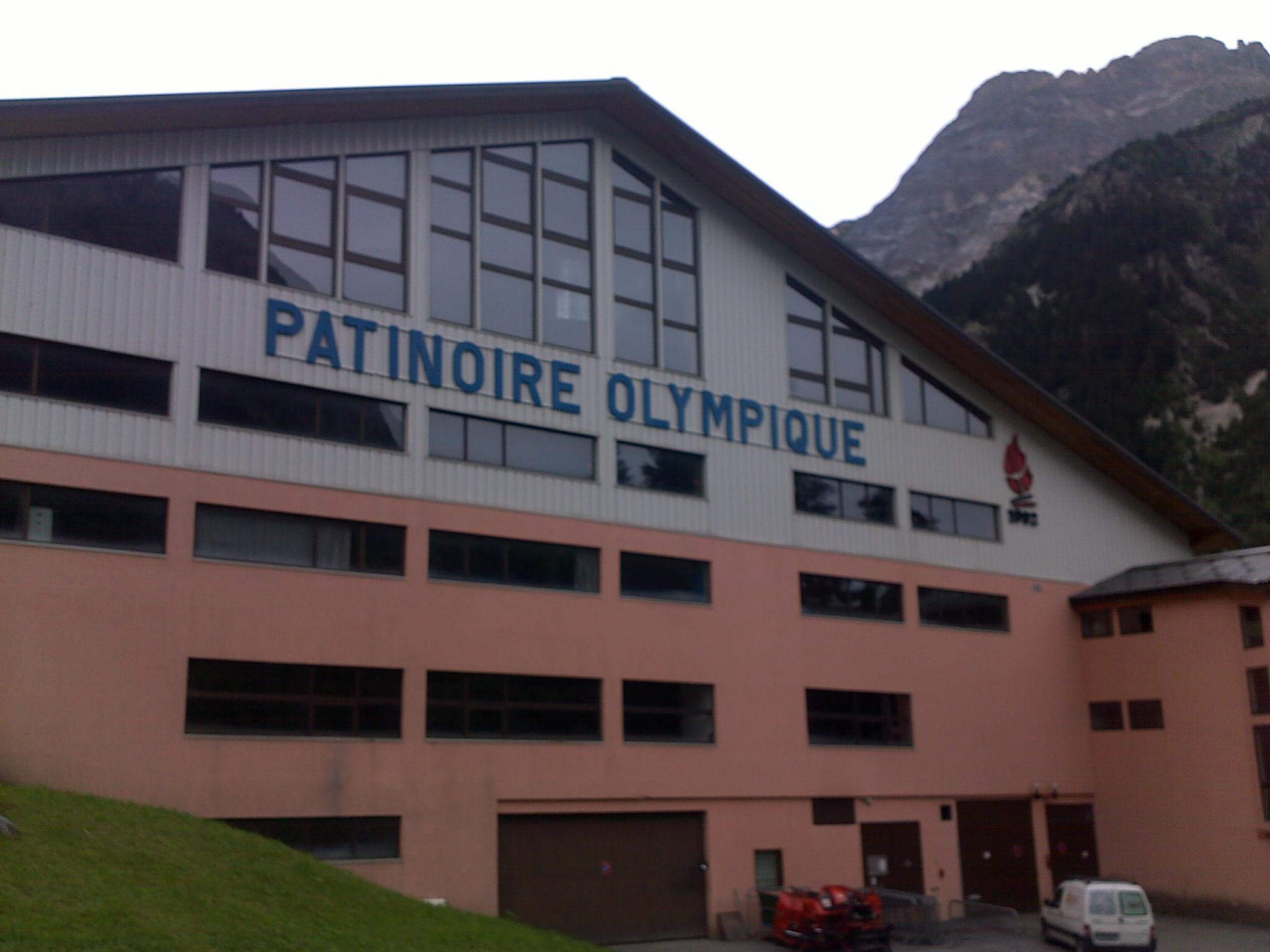
Patinoire olympique de Pralognan-la-Vanoise hosted curling as a demonstration sport at the 1992 Winter Olympics in Albertville.

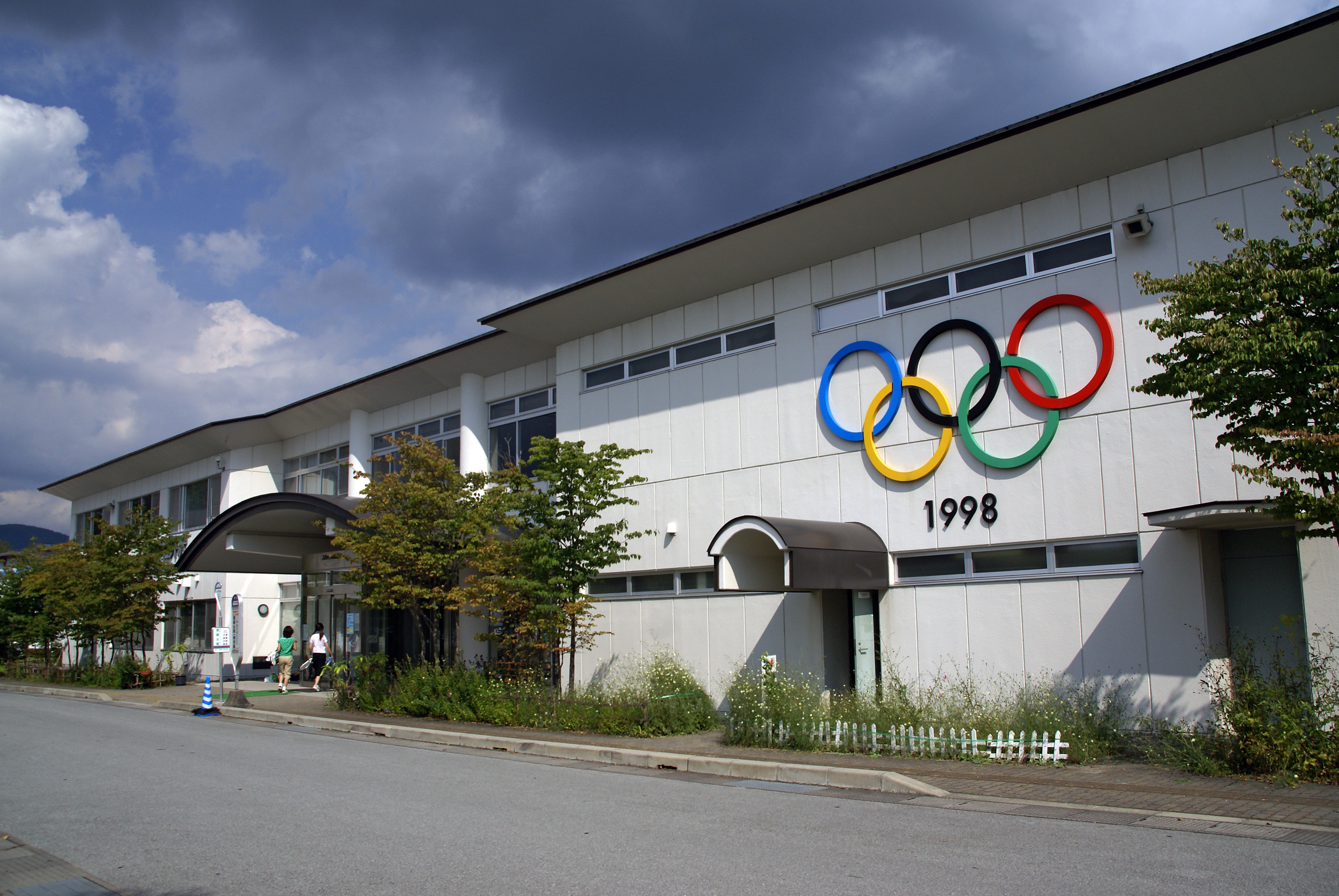
Kazakoshi Park Arena hosted curling at the 1998 Winter Olympics in Nagano.

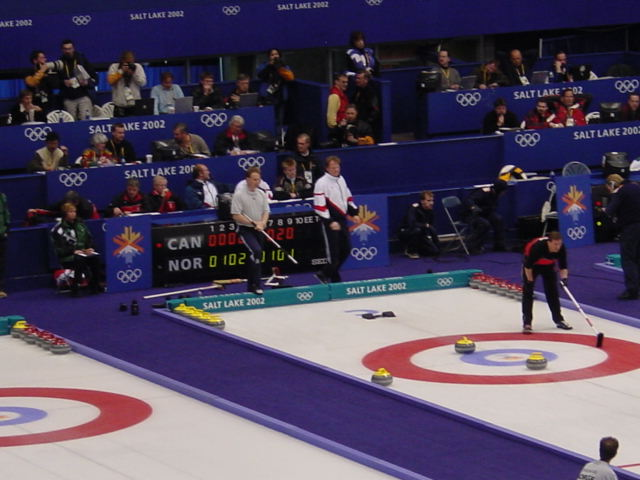
The Ice Sheet at Ogden hosted curling at the 2002 Winter Olympics in Salt Lake City.

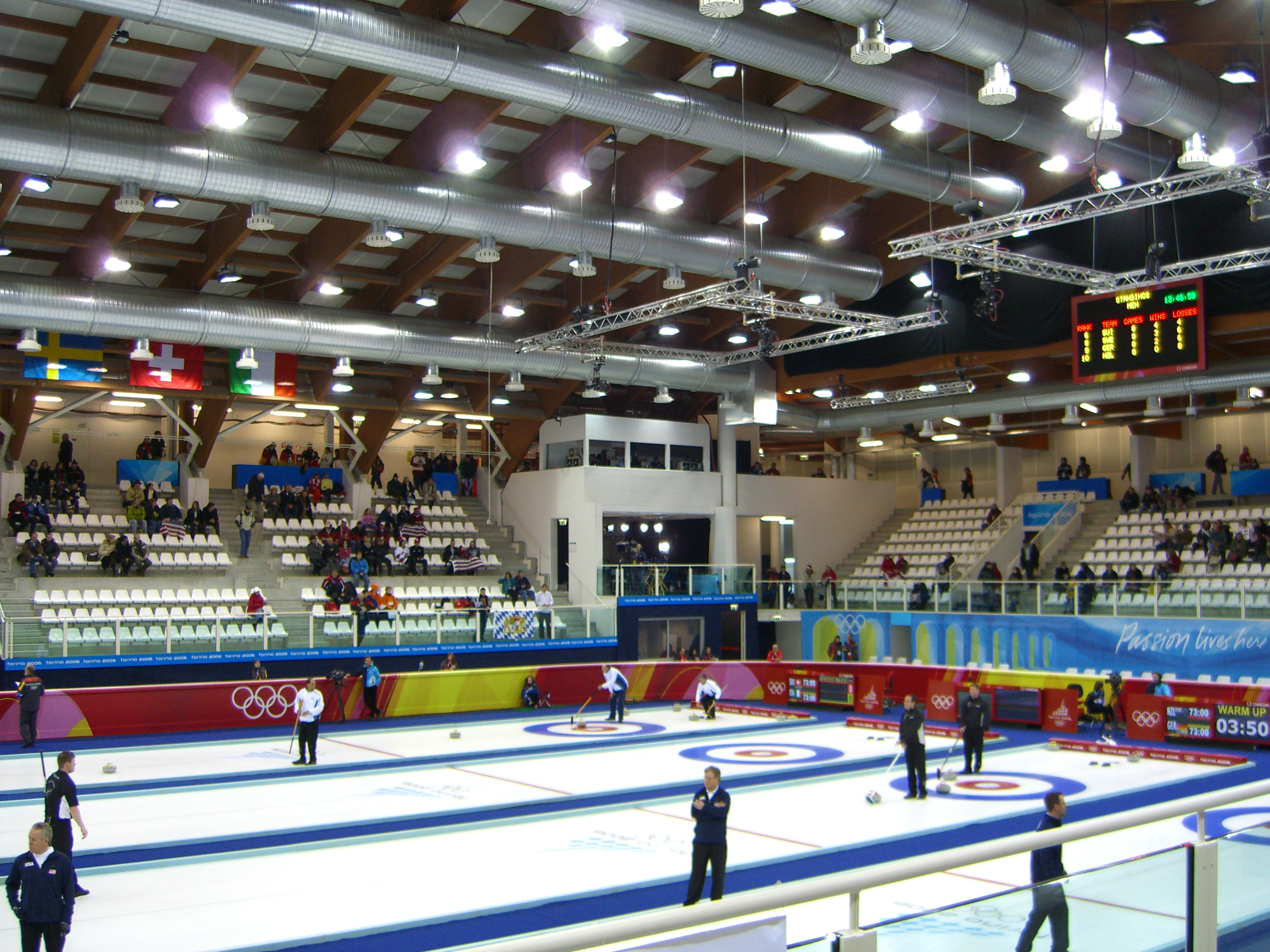
Pinerolo Palaghiaccio hosted curling at the 2006 Winter Olympics in Turin.

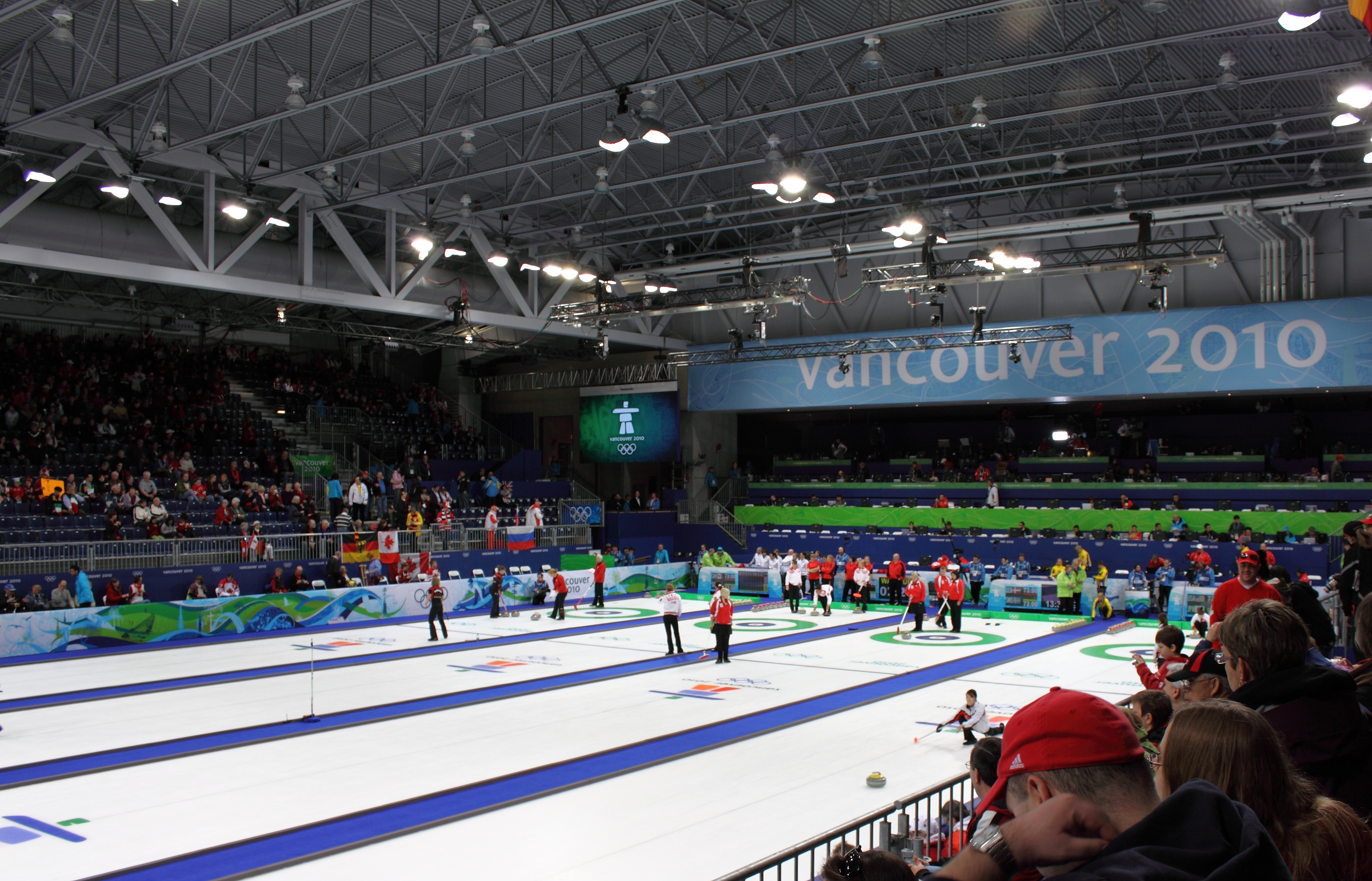
Hillcrest Centre hosted curling at the 2010 Winter Olympics in Vancouver.

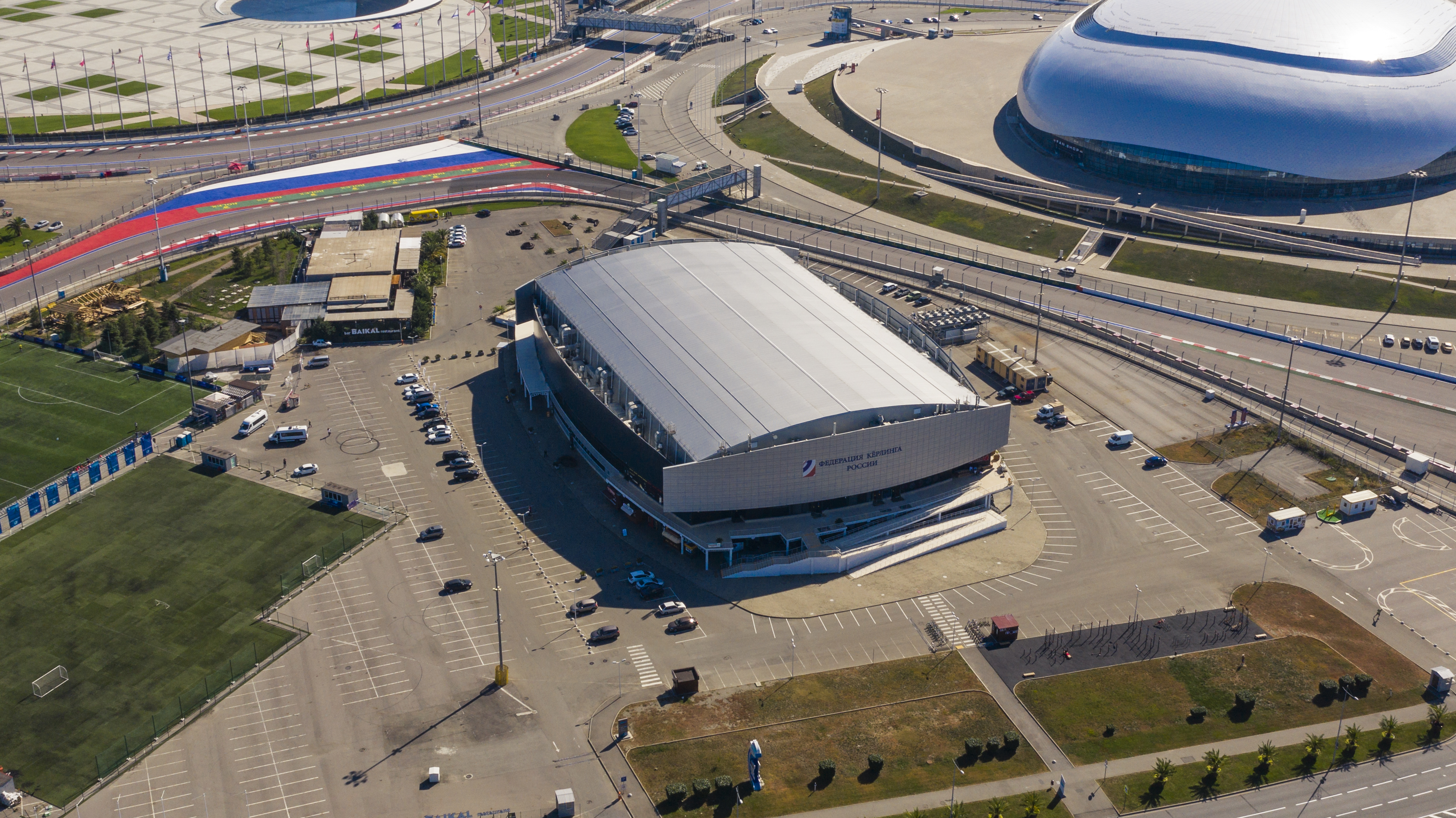
Ice Cube Curling Center hosted curling at the 2014 Winter Olympics in Sochi.

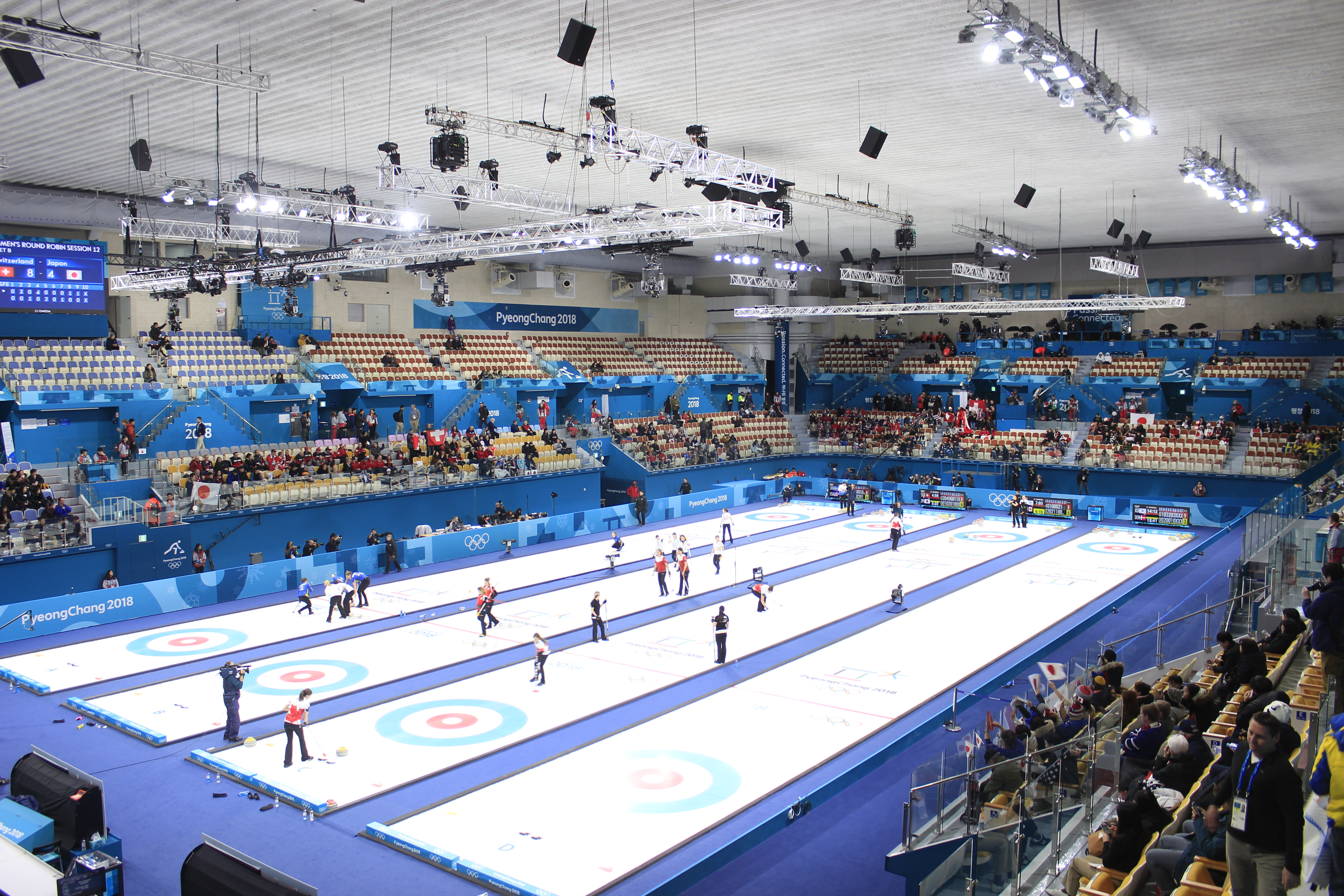
Gangneung Gymnasium hosted curling at the 2018 Winter Olympics in Pyeongchang.

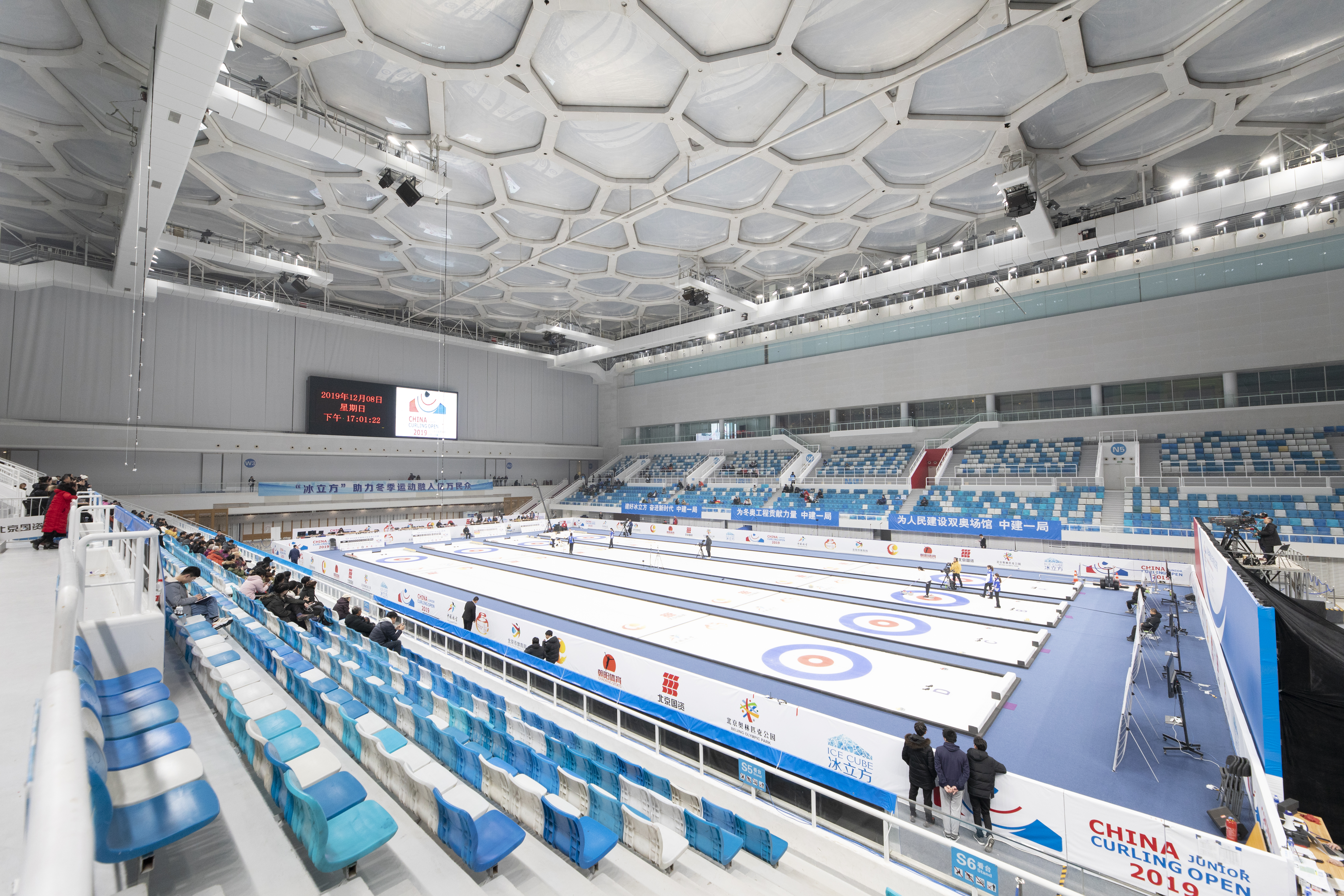
The National Aquatics Centre hosted curling at the 2022 Winter Olympics in Beijing.

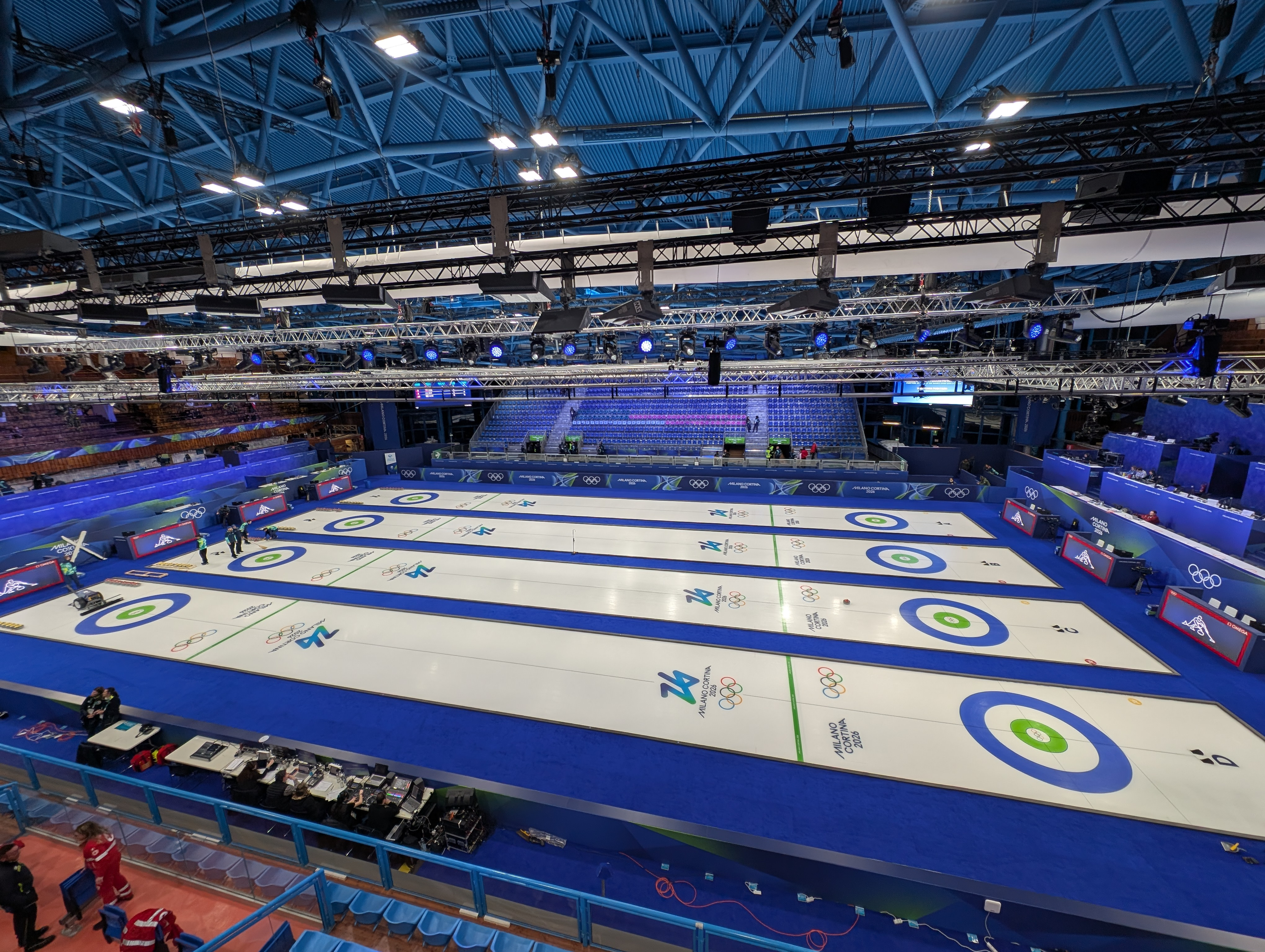
Stadio olimpico del ghiaccio hosted curling at the 2026 Winter Olympics in Cortina d'Ampezzo

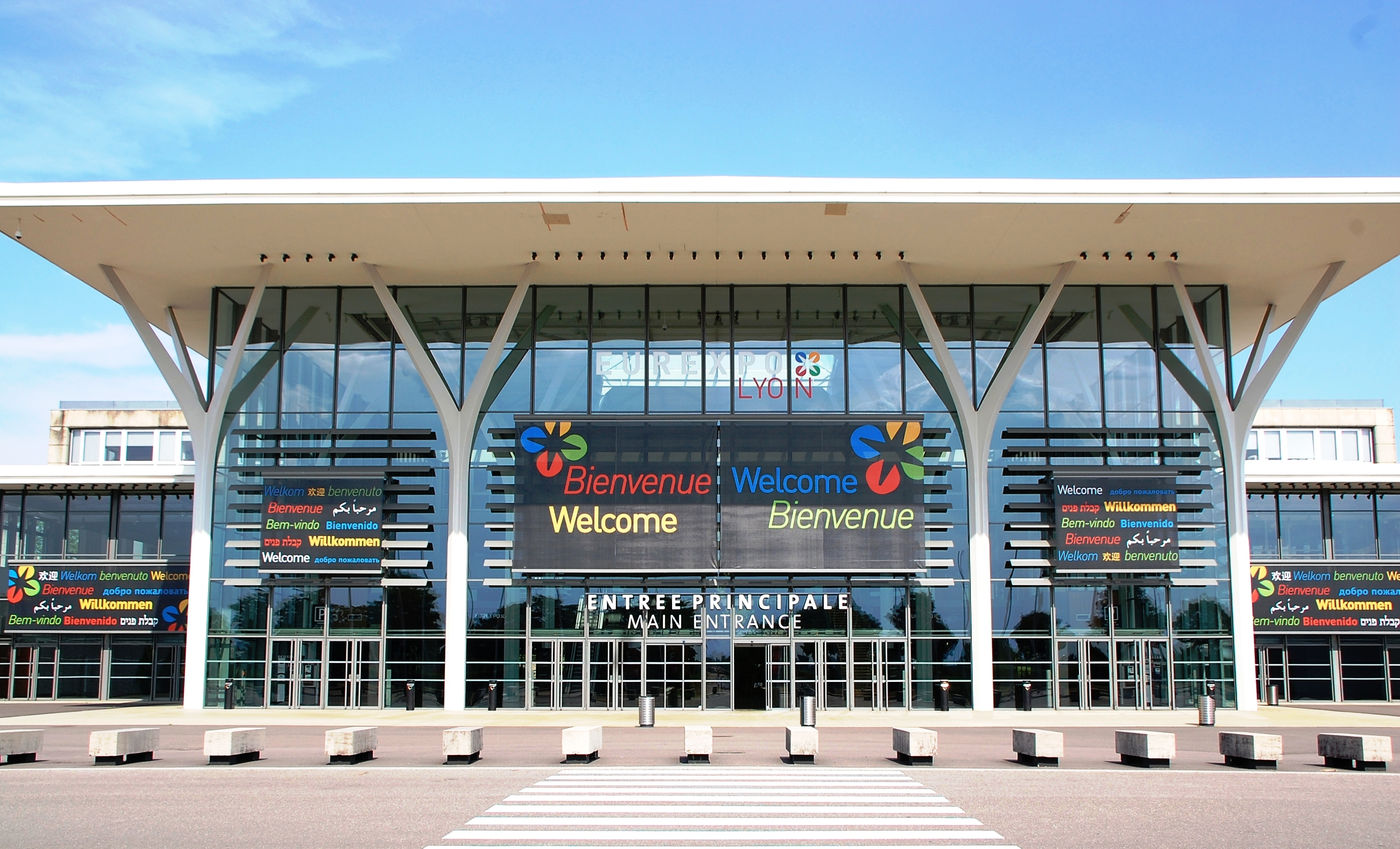
Eurexpo in Lyon will host curling for the 2030 Winter Olympics in the French Alps.

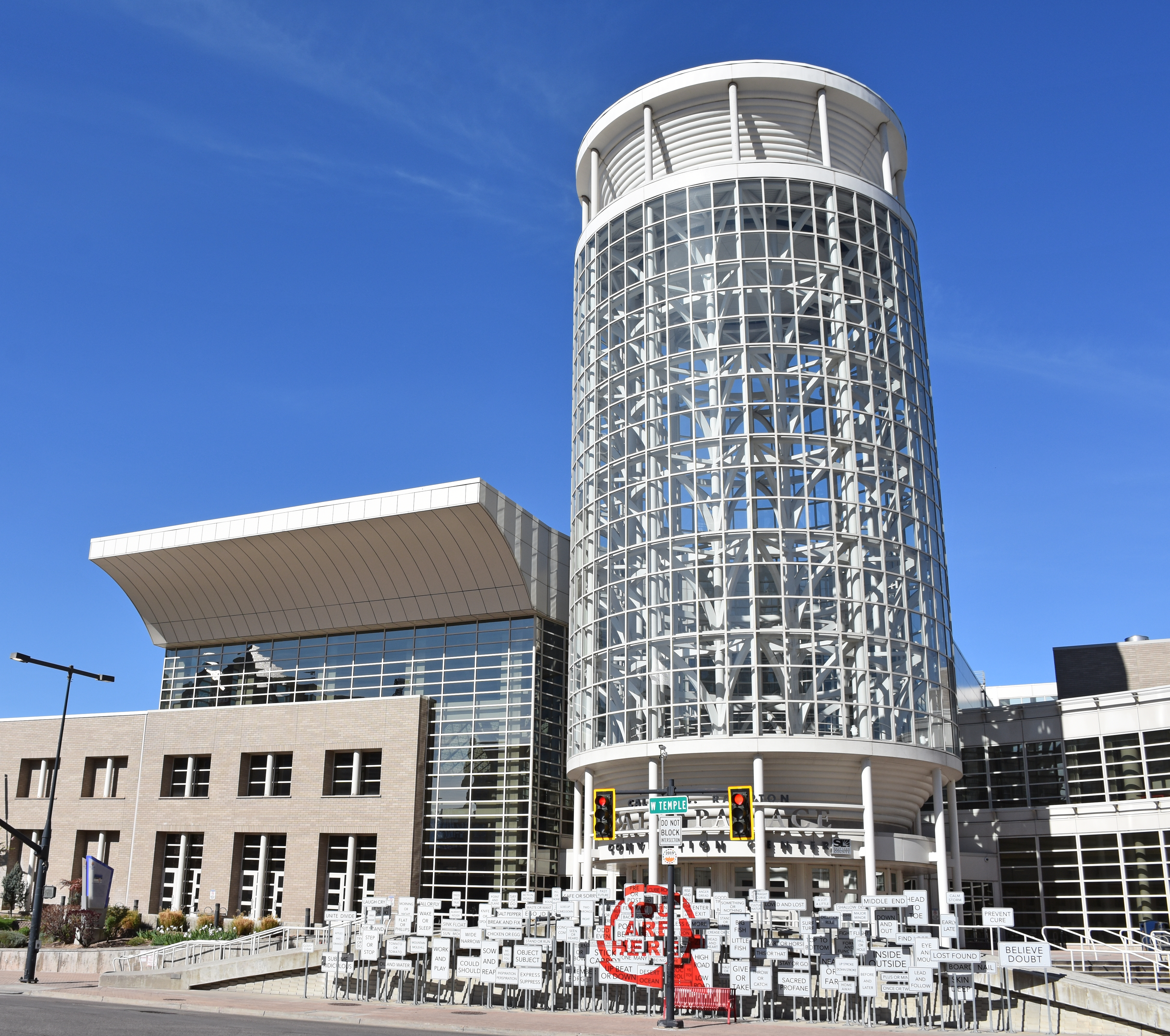
Salt Palace will host curling at the 2034 Winter Olympics in Utah.
