= Ice hockey at the 2025 Winter World University Games =

Ice hockey at the Torino 2025 FISU World University Games
- Hockey pictogram
- Venue: Palasport Tazzoli; Pinerolo Palaghiaccio; Palaghiaccio Olimpico
- Dates: 11–22 January 2025
- Teams: 10 (men); 8 (women)

Ice hockey at the 2025 Winter World University Games comprised two ice hockey tournaments – a men's tournament and a women's tournament – during the Turin 2025 edition of the FISU World University Games. Both tournaments began on 11 January 2025. The women's tournament was hosted in Turin, Italy, and the men's tournament was hosted in Pinerolo, Torre Pellice, and Turin, Italy.

== Medal summary ==
=== Medal table ===
* Host nation (Italy)

| Rank | Nation | Gold | Silver | Bronze | Total |
|---|---|---|---|---|---|
| 1 | Canada | 1 | 1 | 0 | 2 |
| 2 | Czech Republic | 1 | 0 | 0 | 1 |
| 3 | Slovakia | 0 | 1 | 0 | 1 |
| 4 | Japan | 0 | 0 | 1 | 1 |
| 4 | Ukraine | 0 | 0 | 1 | 1 |
| Totals (5 entries) | | 2 | 2 | 2 | 6 |

=== Medalists ===
| Event | Gold | Silver | Bronze |
|---|---|---|---|
| Men | Canada; Mathieu Bizier; Connor Bowie; Charlie Callaghan; Benjamin Corbeil; Jack Duff; Kai Edmonds; Conor Frenette; Mathieu Gagnon; Colson Gengenbach; Kurtis Henry; Mikael Huchette; Samuel Huo; Nolan Hutcheson; Liam Keeler; Francesco Lapenna; Simon Lavigne; Jake Lee; Sasha Mutala; Kale McCallum; Kaleb Pearson; Loris Rafanomezantsoa; Samuel Richard; William Rouleau | Slovakia; Patrik Andrisík; Denis Bakala; Simon Bečár; Tomáš Boľo; Jakub Gaťár; Šimon Groch; Jozef Haščák; Matej Jacko; Matej Komloš; Ján Marcinko; Samuel Nagy; Miroslav Novota; Richard Petráš; Marek Putala; Jakub Ragan; Michal Stanček; Timotej Tomala; Jakub Uram; Lukáš Urbánek; Matúš Zemko; Adam Zlocha | Ukraine; Yevhenii Abadzhian; Rasim Abdullaiev; Denys Borodai; Vladyslav Braha; Oleksandr Filimonov; Artem Hrebenyk; Zakhar Kasatonov; Dmytro Kobylnyk; Hlib Krivoshapkin; Nikita Kruhliakov; Illia Kryklia; Andrii Kryvonozhkin; Danylo Makarenko; Serhii Poimanov; Artem Portnoi; Tymofii Savytskyi; Serhii Stetsiura; Mykyta Sydorenko; Artem Tselohorodtsev; Hlib Varava; Oleksandr Zaruba |
| Women | Czech Republic; Barbora Bartáková; Natálie Brichová; Viktorie Chladová; Barbora Dalecká; Kateřina Dvořáková; Lucie Eignerová; Hana Haasová; Denisa Habartová; Alexandra Halounová; Sandra Halounová; Anežka Hračová; Anna Kotounová; Dominika Malicka; Markéta Mazancová; Tereza Mazancová; Julie Pejšová; Kateřina Petřeková; Patricie Škorpíková; Anna Václavková; Eliška Vaněčková; Anna Vaníčková; Adéla Wojnarová | Canada; Grace Beer; Alexandra-Anne Boyer; Madison Desmarais; Malory Dominico; Sophia Gaskell; Leah Herrfort; Aliya Jomha; Mackenzie Keenan; Émilie Lavoie; Émilie Lussier; Abigail MacKenzie; Jamie Magoffin; Sydney Mercier; Ekaterina Pelowich; Erica Plourde; Emma Potter; Kaitlyn Ross; Gabrielle Santerre; Alexandria Spence; Jordyn Verbeek; Scout Watkins Southward | Japan; Yuka Chujo; Yu Hatade; Anju Hayakawa; Shieru Higuchi; Minami Kamada; Hana Kitajima; Sarasa Kishibe; Sakura Kitamura; Ruka Kiyokawa; Kiku Kobayashi; Komomo Ito; Sakura Ito; Riko Matsumoto; Marin Nagaoka; Haruna Nomura; Riri Noro; Ami Sasaki; Kaho Suzuki; Masaki Tanabe; Ayaka Tomiuchi; Kyoka Tsutsumi; Momoka Yamamoto; Aiko Yoshikawa |

== Men's tournament ==
2025 Winter World University Games – Men's tournament
- Hockey pictogram

Tournament details
- Host country: Italy
- Venues: 3 (in 3 host cities)
- Dates: 11–22 January
- Teams: 10

Final positions
- Champions: Canada (6th title)
- Runners-up: Slovakia
- Third place: Ukraine
- Fourth place: United States

Tournament statistics
- Games played: 31
- Scoring leader: (Canada) Conor Frenette (12 points)

The men's ice hockey tournament at the 2025 Winter World University Games was held during 11 to 22 January 2025. Ten national student teams participated in the event, representing Canada, the Czech Republic, Japan, Kazakhstan, Poland, Slovakia, South Korea, Sweden, Ukraine, and the United States.

The preliminary round was contested in two cities – Group A was hosted at the Pinerolo Palaghiaccio in Pinerolo and Group B at the Palaghiaccio Olimpico in Torre Pellice. Select games of the playoff round were played at Palasport Tazzoli in Turin, in addition to games played at the preliminary round sites.

=== Preliminary round ===
All times are local (UTC+1).

==== Group A ====
| Pos | Team | Pld | W | OTW | OTL | L | GF | GA | GD | Pts | Qualification |
|---|---|---|---|---|---|---|---|---|---|---|---|
| 1 | Czech Republic | 4 | 3 | 1 | 0 | 0 | 13 | 5 | +8 | 11 | Quarterfinals |
| 2 | Canada | 4 | 2 | 1 | 1 | 0 | 24 | 9 | +15 | 9 | Quarterfinals |
| 3 | Kazakhstan | 4 | 2 | 0 | 1 | 1 | 20 | 10 | +10 | 7 | Quarterfinals |
| 4 | South Korea | 4 | 0 | 1 | 0 | 3 | 5 | 25 | −20 | 2 | Quarterfinals |
| 5 | Sweden | 4 | 0 | 0 | 1 | 3 | 10 | 23 | −13 | 1 | |

Source: FISU

| 11 January 2025; 20:00 | Canada | 11–0 (0–0, 7–0, 4–0) | South Korea | Pinerolo Palaghiaccio, Pinerolo; Attendance: 950 |

Game reference
| 2 min | Penalties | 2 min |
| 61 | Shots | 9 |

| 12 January 2025; 16:30 | Sweden | 2–9 (2–2, 0–3, 0–4) | Kazakhstan | Pinerolo Palaghiaccio, Pinerolo; Attendance: 580 |

Game reference
| 10 min | Penalties | 6 min |
| 11 | Shots | 51 |

| 12 January 2025; 20:00 | Czech Republic | 2–1 GWS (0–1, 0–0, 1–0) (OT: 0–0) (SO: 1–0) | Canada | Pinerolo Palaghiaccio, Pinerolo; Attendance: 1,800 |

Game reference
| 4 min | Penalties | 2 min |
| 14 | Shots | 48 |

| 14 January 2025; 16:30 | Kazakhstan | 7–1 (3–0, 2–0, 2–1) | South Korea | Pinerolo Palaghiaccio, Pinerolo; Attendance: 400 |

Game reference
| 4 min | Penalties | 12 min |
| 36 | Shots | 23 |

| 14 January 2025; 20:00 | Czech Republic | 3–2 (1–1, 2–0, 0–1) | Sweden | Pinerolo Palaghiaccio, Pinerolo |

Game reference
| 6 min | Penalties | 6 min |
| 34 | Shots | 19 |

| 15 January 2025; 16:30 | South Korea | 1–5 (1–1, 0–2, 0–2) | Czech Republic | Pinerolo Palaghiaccio, Pinerolo; Attendance: 400 |

Game reference
| 8 min | Penalties | 4 min |
| 14 | Shots | 39 |

| 15 January 2025; 20:00 | Canada | 4–3 GWS (1–0, 0–2, 2–1) (OT: 0–0) (SO: 1–0) | Kazakhstan | Pinerolo Palaghiaccio, Pinerolo |

Game reference
| 18 min | Penalties | 24 min |
| 57 | Shots | 25 |

| 16 January 2025; 20:00 | Sweden | 4–8 (1–3, 1–2, 2–3) | Canada | Pinerolo Palaghiaccio, Pinerolo |

Game reference
| 14 min | Penalties | 14 min |
| 19 | Shots | 54 |

| 17 January 2025; 16:30 | South Korea | 3–2 GWS (1–0, 1–1, 0–1) (OT: 0–0) (SO: 1–0) | Sweden | Pinerolo Palaghiaccio, Pinerolo |

Game reference
| 8 min | Penalties | 6 min |
| 20 | Shots | 35 |

| 17 January 2025; 20:00 | Kazakhstan | 1–3 (1–0, 0–1, 0–2) | Czech Republic | Pinerolo Palaghiaccio, Pinerolo |

Game reference
| 35 min | Penalties | 6 min |
| 31 | Shots | 28 |

==== Group B ====
| Pos | Team | Pld | W | OTW | OTL | L | GF | GA | GD | Pts | Qualification |
|---|---|---|---|---|---|---|---|---|---|---|---|
| 1 | United States | 4 | 3 | 1 | 0 | 0 | 22 | 9 | +13 | 11 | Quarterfinals |
| 2 | Slovakia | 4 | 3 | 0 | 1 | 0 | 18 | 11 | +7 | 10 | Quarterfinals |
| 3 | Japan | 4 | 2 | 0 | 0 | 2 | 17 | 14 | +3 | 6 | Quarterfinals |
| 4 | Ukraine | 4 | 1 | 0 | 0 | 3 | 15 | 18 | −3 | 3 | Quarterfinals |
| 5 | Poland | 4 | 0 | 0 | 0 | 4 | 7 | 27 | −20 | 0 | |

Source: FISU

| 11 January 2025; 20:00 | Slovakia | 4–1 (0–0, 3–1, 1–0) | Japan | Palaghiaccio Olimpico, Torre Pellice |

Game reference
| 8 min | Penalties | 12 min |
| 36 | Shots | 26 |

| 12 January 2025; 16:30 | Poland | 2–6 (1–3, 1–2, 0–1) | United States | Palaghiaccio Olimpico, Torre Pellice |

Game reference
| 6 min | Penalties | 14 min |
| 24 | Shots | 44 |

| 12 January 2025; 20:00 | Ukraine | 2–4 (1–1, 1–3, 0–0) | Slovakia | Palaghiaccio Olimpico, Torre Pellice |

Game reference
| 33 min | Penalties | 8 min |
| 20 | Shots | 33 |

| 14 January 2025; 16:30 | United States | 5–1 (2–0, 1–0, 2–1) | Japan | Palaghiaccio Olimpico, Torre Pellice |

Game reference
| 10 min | Penalties | 12 min |
| 27 | Shots | 30 |

| 14 January 2025; 20:00 | Ukraine | 8–2 (1–0, 3–2, 4–0) | Poland | Palaghiaccio Olimpico, Torre Pellice |

Game reference
| 10 min | Penalties | 12 min |
| 50 | Shots | 26 |

| 15 January 2025; 16:30 | Japan | 7–4 (1–2, 4–0, 2–2) | Ukraine | Palaghiaccio Olimpico, Torre Pellice |

Game reference
| 10 min | Penalties | 31 min |
| 49 | Shots | 38 |

| 15 January 2025; 20:00 | Slovakia | 5–6 GWS (3–3, 1–2, 1–0) (OT: 0–0) (SO: 0–1) | United States | Palaghiaccio Olimpico, Torre Pellice |

Game reference
| 12 min | Penalties | 16 min |
| 54 | Shots | 38 |

| 16 January 2025; 20:00 | Poland | 2–5 (1–0, 0–3, 1–2) | Slovakia | Palaghiaccio Olimpico, Torre Pellice |

Game reference
| 10 min | Penalties | 4 min |
| 14 | Shots | 54 |

| 17 January 2025; 16:30 | Japan | 8–1 (2–1, 4–0, 2–0) | Poland | Palaghiaccio Olimpico, Torre Pellice |

Game reference
| 8 min | Penalties | 10 min |
| 55 | Shots | 33 |

| 17 January 2025; 20:00 | United States | 5–1 (3–0, 1–0, 1–1) | Ukraine | Palaghiaccio Olimpico, Torre Pellice |

Game reference
| 14 min | Penalties | 10 min |
| 42 | Shots | 45 |

=== Playoff round ===
==== Bracket ====
Quarterfinals
19 January
Czech Republic | 3
Ukraine (OT) | 4
19 January
Slovakia | 2
Kazakhstan | 1
19 January
United States | 12
South Korea | 3
19 January
Canada | 9
Japan | 1

Semifinals
21 January
Ukraine | 1
Slovakia | 3
21 January
United States | 2
Canada | 10

Final
22 January
Slovakia | 1
Canada | 3
Third place
22 January
Ukraine | 5
United States | 3

==== Quarterfinals ====
| 19 January; 16:30 | Czech Republic | 3–4 OT (1–1, 0–1, 2–1) (OT: 0–1) | Ukraine | Pinerolo Palaghiaccio, Pinerolo |

Game reference
| 10 min | Penalties | 12 min |
| 38 | Shots | 24 |

| 19 January; 16:30 | United States | 12–3 (3–0, 5–3, 4–0) | South Korea | Palaghiaccio Olimpico, Torre Pellice |

Game reference
| 4 min | Penalties | 10 min |
| 54 | Shots | 28 |

| 19 January; 20:00 | Canada | 9–1 (5–0, 2–0, 2–1) | Japan | Pinerolo Palaghiaccio, Pinerolo |

Game reference
| 8 min | Penalties | 8 min |
| 36 | Shots | 17 |

| 19 January; 20:00 | Slovakia | 2–1 (0–0, 2–1, 0–0) | Kazakhstan | Palaghiaccio Olimpico, Torre Pellice |

Game reference
| 10 min | Penalties | 6 min |
| 31 | Shots | 43 |

==== Semifinals ====
| 21 January; 16:00 | Ukraine | 1–3 (0–1, 0–1, 1–1) | Slovakia | Palasport Tazzoli, Turin |

Game reference
| 45 min | Penalties | 35 min |
| 25 | Shots | 37 |

| 21 January; 20:00 | United States | 2–10 (1–1, 1–5, 0–4) | Canada | Palasport Tazzoli, Turin |

Game reference
| 16 min | Penalties | 12 min |
| 14 | Shots | 64 |

==== Ninth place game ====
| 20 January; 16:30 | Sweden | 4–3 GWS (1–1, 1–1, 1–1) (OT: 0–0) (SO: 1–0) | Poland | Pinerolo Palaghiaccio, Pinerolo |

Game reference
| 8 min | Penalties | 18 min |
| 33 | Shots | 24 |

==== Seventh place game ====
| 20 January; 20:00 | Japan | 6–1 (1–1, 2–0, 3–0) | South Korea | Pinerolo Palaghiaccio, Pinerolo |

Game reference
| 4 min | Penalties | 14 min |
| 36 | Shots | 13 |

==== Fifth place game ====
| 20 January; 20:00 | Czech Republic | 2–5 (0–0, 2–2, 0–3) | Kazakhstan | Palaghiaccio Olimpico, Torre Pellice |

Game reference
| 4 min | Penalties | 10 min |
| 45 | Shots | 33 |

==== Bronze medal game ====
| 22 January; 16:00 | Ukraine | 5–3 (2–1, 2–1, 1–1) | United States | Palasport Tazzoli, Turin |

Game reference
| 11 min | Penalties | 33 min |
| 32 | Shots | 28 |

==== Gold medal game ====
| 22 January; 20:00 | Slovakia | 1–3 (0–1, 1–1, 0–1) | Canada | Palasport Tazzoli, Turin |

| 33 min | Penalties | 33 min |
| 25 | Shots | 42 |

=== Final standings ===
| Pos | Team | Pld | W | OTW | OTL | L | GF | GA | GD | Pts | Final Result |
|---|---|---|---|---|---|---|---|---|---|---|---|
| 1 | Canada | 7 | 5 | 1 | 1 | 0 | 46 | 13 | +33 | 18 | Winners |
| 2 | Slovakia | 7 | 5 | 0 | 1 | 1 | 24 | 16 | +8 | 16 | Runners-Up |
| 3 | Ukraine | 7 | 2 | 1 | 0 | 4 | 25 | 27 | −2 | 8 | Third Place |
| 4 | United States | 7 | 4 | 1 | 0 | 2 | 39 | 27 | +12 | 14 | Fourth Place |
| 5 | Kazakhstan | 6 | 3 | 0 | 1 | 2 | 26 | 14 | +12 | 10 | Fifth Place Game |
| 6 | Czech Republic | 6 | 3 | 1 | 1 | 1 | 18 | 14 | +4 | 12 | Fifth Place Game |
| 7 | Japan | 6 | 3 | 0 | 0 | 3 | 24 | 24 | 0 | 9 | Seventh Place Game |
| 8 | South Korea | 6 | 0 | 1 | 0 | 5 | 9 | 43 | −34 | 2 | Seventh Place Game |
| 9 | Sweden | 5 | 0 | 1 | 1 | 3 | 14 | 26 | −12 | 3 | Ninth Place Game |
| 10 | Poland | 5 | 0 | 0 | 1 | 4 | 10 | 31 | −21 | 1 | Ninth Place Game |

Updated to match(es) played on 22 January 2025. Source: FISU

== Women's tournament ==
2025 Winter World University Games – Women's tournament
- Hockey pictogram

Tournament details
- Host country: Italy
- Venue: 1 (in 1 host city)
- Dates: 11–20 January
- Teams: 8

Final positions
- Champions: Czech Republic (1st title)
- Runners-up: Canada
- Third place: Japan
- Fourth place: Slovakia

Tournament statistics
- Games played: 20
- Scoring leader: (Czech Republic) Barbora Bartáková (13 points)

The Turin 2025 women's ice hockey tournament was held during 11 to 20 January 2025 at Palasport Tazzoli in Turin, Italy. Eight national student teams participated in the event, representing Canada, Chinese Taipei, the Czech Republic, Great Britain, Japan, Kazakhstan, Slovakia, and the United States.

In the preliminary round, each team was placed in a closed group of four teams and played a single round-robin to determine seeding for the playoff round. The first and second ranked team in each group progressed to the semifinals and the remaining teams faced off in the 5-8 semifinals. The outcomes of the semifinals determined matchups for all placement games.

=== Preliminary round ===
==== Group A ====
| Pos | Team | Pld | W | OTW | OTL | L | GF | GA | GD | Pts | Qualification |
|---|---|---|---|---|---|---|---|---|---|---|---|
| 1 | Canada | 3 | 3 | 0 | 0 | 0 | 36 | 2 | +34 | 9 | Semifinals |
| 2 | Slovakia | 3 | 2 | 0 | 0 | 1 | 28 | 8 | +20 | 6 | Semifinals |
| 3 | Chinese Taipei | 3 | 1 | 0 | 0 | 2 | 10 | 22 | −12 | 3 | |
| 4 | Great Britain | 3 | 0 | 0 | 0 | 3 | 0 | 42 | −42 | 0 | |

Source: FISU

Results

| 11 January 2025; 16:30 | Slovakia | 20–0 (10–0, 4–0, 6–0) | Great Britain | Palasport Tazzoli, Turin |

Game reference

Andrea Rišianová
Simona Macková
Goalies
Georgia Ashton
Referees:
(Italy) Melissa Boverio
(Germany) Caroline Butt
Linesmen:
(Germany) Julia Wagner
(Finland) Aino Ranki

| Leskovjanská – 00:18 | 1–0 |
| Glosíková (Kúbeková, Nemčeková) – 00:52 | 2–0 |
| R. Halušková – 01:48 | 3–0 |
| Kúbeková (Glosíková, Nemčeková) – 12:44 | 4–0 |
| Vysokajová (Čilíková, A. Šulíková) – 14:31 | 5–0 |
| Nemčeková – 16:42 | 6–0 |
| Čilíková (Vysokajová) – 17:43 | 7–0 |
| L. Halušková (Fančovičová) – 18:02 | 8–0 |
| Kúbeková (Glosíková) – 18:39 | 9–0 |
| Kúbeková (Jašková) – 19:39 | 10–0 |
| Glosíková (Kúbeková, Janeková) – 26:15 | 11–0 |
| Nemčeková (L. Šulíková) – 29:30 | 12–0 |
| Kúbeková (Janeková) – 32:51 | 13–0 |
| Plankenauerová (Fančovičová) – 39:31 | 14–0 |
| R. Halušková (PP1) – 41:07 | 15–0 |
| Plankenauerová – 44:04 | 16–0 |
| Nemčeková – 45:56 | 17–0 |
| A. Šulíková (R. Halušková, Lodňanová) – 46:21 | 18–0 |
| Nemčeková (Glosíková) – 48:26 | 19–0 |
| Jašková (Kúbeková, Fančovičová) – 56:56 | 20–0 |

0 min
Penalties
6 min
71
Shots
5

| 11 January 2025; 20:00 | Canada | 16–0 (3–0, 7–0, 6–0) | Chinese Taipei | Palasport Tazzoli, Turin |

Game reference

Kaitlyn Ross
Goalies
Chung Ai
Chiu Yu-Ting
Referees:
(United States) Taylor-Anne Hill
(Japan) Kumiko Matsuo
Linesmen:
(United States) Amanda Ziola
(Italy) Maria Da Rech

| Plourde (MacKenzie) – 06:34 | 1–0 |
| Desmarais (Mercier) – 13:01 | 2–0 |
| Lussier (Lavoie) – 19:03 | 3–0 |
| Plourde (Desmarais) – 26:50 | 4–0 |
| Herrfort – 28:21 | 5–0 |
| Desmarais (Plourde, MacKenzie) – 30:13 | 6–0 |
| Herrfort – 31:17 | 7–0 |
| Dominico (Keenan) – 32:42 | 8–0 |
| Lussier (Herrfort) – 35:26 | 9–0 |
| Jomha (Dominico, Santerre) – 36:25 | 10–0 |
| Magoffin (Pelowich) – 43:36 | 11–0 |
| Watkins Southward – 43:49 | 12–0 |
| Lavoie (MacKenzie) – 44:24 | 13–0 |
| Herrfort (Lussier) – 47:52 | 14–0 |
| Jomha – 48:38 | 15–0 |
| Desmarais – 50:01 | 16–0 |

2 min
Penalties
4 min
84
Shots
7

| 13 January 2025; 9:30 | Slovakia | 6–2 (1–0, 2–1, 3–1) | Chinese Taipei | Palasport Tazzoli, Turin |

Game reference

Andrea Rišianová
Goalies
Chung Ai
Referees:
(United States) Taylor-Anne Hill
(Canada) Audrey-Anne Girard
Linesmen:
(Japan) Niina Sato
(United States) Amanda Ziola

| L. Šulíková (Janeková, Kúbeková) – 14:30 | 1–0 |
| Plankenauerová (Fančovičová) – 30:35 | 2–0 |
| Nemčeková (L. Šulíková, Rišianová) – 31:47 | 3–0 |
| | 3–1 | 34:00 – Huang |
| Plankenauerová (Leskovjanská, L. Halušková) – 40:33 | 4–1 |
| L. Halušková (Plankenauerová, Leskovjanská) (PP1) – 50:25 | 5–1 |
| | 5–2 | 52:16 – Tan (Huang) |
| Nemčeková (L. Šulíková) – 54:32 | 6–2 |

6 min
Penalties
2 min
53
Shots
14

| 13 January 2025; 13:00 | Great Britain | 0–14 (0–4, 0–4, 0–6) | Canada | Palasport Tazzoli, Turin |

Game reference
| 12 min | Penalties | 2 min |
| 2 | Shots | 89 |

| 15 January 2025; 16:30 | Chinese Taipei | 8–0 (1–0, 5–0, 2–0) | Great Britain | Palasport Tazzoli, Turin |

Game reference
| 2 min | Penalties | 12 min |
| 53 | Shots | 12 |

| 15 January 2025; 20:00 | Canada | 6–2 (2–0, 3–1, 1–1) | Slovakia | Palasport Tazzoli, Turin |

Game reference
| 14 min | Penalties | 4 min |
| 48 | Shots | 16 |

==== Group B ====
| Pos | Team | Pld | W | OTW | OTL | L | GF | GA | GD | Pts | Qualification |
|---|---|---|---|---|---|---|---|---|---|---|---|
| 1 | Czech Republic | 3 | 3 | 0 | 0 | 0 | 21 | 4 | +17 | 9 | Semifinals |
| 2 | Japan | 3 | 2 | 0 | 0 | 1 | 15 | 4 | +11 | 6 | Semifinals |
| 3 | United States | 3 | 1 | 0 | 0 | 2 | 8 | 11 | −3 | 3 | |
| 4 | Kazakhstan | 3 | 0 | 0 | 0 | 3 | 1 | 26 | −25 | 0 | |

Source: FISU

| 12 January 2025; 16:30 | Czech Republic | 6–3 (1–1, 3–1, 2–1) | United States | Palasport Tazzoli, Turin |

Game reference
| 8 min | Penalties | 8 min |
| 34 | Shots | 13 |

| 12 January 2025; 20:00 | Japan | 10–0 (4–0, 1–0, 5–0) | Kazakhstan | Palasport Tazzoli, Turin |

Game reference
| 4 min | Penalties | 0 min |
| 68 | Shots | 9 |

| 14 January 2025; 16:30 | Czech Republic | 11–1 (5–0, 3–1, 3–0) | Kazakhstan | Palasport Tazzoli, Turin |

Game reference
| 10 min | Penalties | 14 min |
| 40 | Shots | 15 |

| 14 January 2025; 20:00 | United States | 0–5 (0–0, 0–3, 0–2) | Japan | Palasport Tazzoli, Turin |

Game reference
| 6 min | Penalties | 12 min |
| 15 | Shots | 51 |

| 16 January 2025; 16:30 | Kazakhstan | 0–5 (0–0, 0–1, 0–4) | United States | Palasport Tazzoli, Turin |

Game reference
| 10 min | Penalties | 8 min |
| 25 | Shots | 47 |

| 16 January 2025; 20:00 | Japan | 0–4 (0–0, 0–4, 0–0) | Czech Republic | Palasport Tazzoli, Turin |

Game reference
| 6 min | Penalties | 2 min |
| 21 | Shots | 30 |

=== Playoff round ===
==== Bracket ====
Semifinals
18 January
Canada | 3
Japan | 0
18 January
Czech Republic | 3
Slovakia | 1

Final
20 January
Canada | 1
Czech Republic (OT) | 2
Third place
20 January
Japan | 2
Slovakia | 1

Fifth place bracket

5–8th place semifinals
17 January
Chinese Taipei | 3
Kazakhstan | 4
17 January
United States | 14
Great Britain | 0

Fifth place
19 January
Kazakhstan | 2
United States | 8
Seventh place
19 January
Chinese Taipei | 6
Great Britain | 0

==== 5th-8th place semifinals ====
| 17 January 2025; 16:30 | Chinese Taipei | 3–4 (2–2, 0–1, 1–1) | Kazakhstan | Palasport Tazzoli, Turin |

Game reference

Chung Ai
Goalies
Polina Govtva
Referees:
(United States) Taylor-Anne Hill
(Japan) Kumiko Matsuo
Linesmen:
(Japan) Niina Sato
(Germany) Julia Wagner

| Tan – 07:56 | 1–0 |
| | 1–1 | 11:11 – Shegay (Yakoleva) (SH1) |
| | 1–2 | 17:51 – M. Sayakhatkyzy (Shegay) |
| Lin Yi. (Chang En-W.) – 18:59 | 2–2 |
| | 2–3 | 38:15 – Ivanchenko (M. Sayakhatkyzy) |
| Huang (Chang En-N.) – 43:05 | 3–3 |
| | 3–4 | 54:01 – Kutsenko |

4 min
Penalties
8 min
20
Shots
35

| 17 January 2025; 20:00 | United States | 14–0 (4–0, 2–0, 8–0) | Great Britain | Palasport Tazzoli, Turin |

Game reference

Rieley Jessie-Gerelli
Goalies
Holly Bihun
Georgia Ashton
Referees:
(Germany) Caroline Butt
(Slovakia) Zuzana Rimbalová
Linesmen:
(Slovakia) Eva Mária Moleková
(United States) Amanda Ziola

| Gustafson (Lindahl) – 08:45 | 1–0 |
| Palaian (Jeffers) – 10:12 | 2–0 |
| Fussy (Battles) – 10:38 | 3–0 |
| Hanson (Ackerman) – 17:44 | 4–0 |
| Hanson (Hansen) – 31:09 | 5–0 |
| Hansen – 38:49 | 6–0 |
| Battles (SH1) – 41:05 | 7–0 |
| Maliszewski (Hanson) – 42:18 | 8–0 |
| Battles (Fussy, Vandenbussche) – 42:48 | 9–0 |
| Villard (Fussy) (PP1) – 47:13 | 10–0 |
| Villard (Fussy) (PP1) – 50:33 | 11–0 |
| Fussy (Villard) – 56:28 | 12–0 |
| L. Swanson (Hansen, Palaian) – 57:36 | 13–0 |
| K. Swanson – 59:51 | 14–0 |

8 min
Penalties
14 min
73
Shots
9

==== Semifinals ====
| 18 January 2025; 16:00 | Canada | 3–0 (1–0, 1–0, 1–0) | Japan | Palasport Tazzoli, Turin |

Game reference

Jordyn Verbeek
Kaitlyn Ross
Goalies
Kiku Kobayashi
Referees:
(Italy) Melissa Boverio
(United States) Taylor-Anne Hill
Linesmen:
(Slovakia) Eva Mária Moleková
(Italy) Mara Da Rech

| Desmarais (Potter, Mercier) – 07:00 | 1–0 |
| Spence (MacKenzie, Desmarais) – 31:44 | 2–0 |
| Santerre – 43:58 | 3–0 |

4 min
Penalties
2 min
31
Shots
18

| 18 January 2025; 20:00 | Czech Republic | 3–1 (1–0, 1–1, 1–0) | Slovakia | Palasport Tazzoli, Turin |

Game reference

Julie Pejšová
Goalies
Andrea Rišianová
Referees:
(Canada) Audrey-Anne Girard
(Germany) Caroline Butt
Linesmen:
(United States) Amanda Ziola
(Germany) Julia Wagner

| Habartová (Bartáková, Haasová) (PP1) – 13:34 | 1–0 |
| Bartáková – 29:38 | 2–0 |
| | 2–1 | 31:25 – L. Halušková (SH1) |
| A. Halounová (S. Halounová) – 51:53 | 3–1 |

4 min
Penalties
12 min
33
Shots
19

==== Seventh place game ====
| 19 January 2025; 16:30 | Chinese Taipei | 6–0 (1–0, 2–0, 3–0) | Great Britain | Palasport Tazzoli, Turin |

Game reference

Chung Ai
Chiu Yi-Ting
Goalies
Holly Bihun
Referees:
(Italy) Melissa Boverio
(Japan) Kumiko Matsuo
Linesmen:
(United States) Amanda Ziola
(Japan) Niina Sato

| Chang En-N. (Chan) – 13:16 | 1–0 |
| Chang En-N. (Wu) – 20:59 | 2–0 |
| Wu – 30:12 | 3–0 |
| Tao – 46:08 | 4–0 |
| Tan – 47:53 | 5–0 |
| Chang En-N. (PP1) – 55:58 | 6–0 |

2 min
Penalties
6 min
57
Shots
25

==== Fifth place game ====
| 19 January 2025; 20:00 | Kazakhstan | 2–8 (1–3, 1–1, 0–4) | United States | Palasport Tazzoli, Turin |

Game reference

Polina Govtva
Diana Iskakova
Goalies
Rieley Jessie-Gerelli
Referees:
(Slovakia) Zuzana Rimbalová
(Canada) Audrey-Anne Girard
Linesmen:
(Finland) Aino Ranki
(Germany) Julia Wagner

| | 0–1 | 00:47 – Fussy |
| Shegay (Kenessova) – 03:40 | 1–1 |
| | 1–2 | 11:47 – Paulsen (Hansen) |
| | 1–3 | 15:04 – Lindahl |
| | 1–4 | 27:08 – Greene (Fussy) |
| Kutsenko (Ivanchenko, Nussupova) – 29:56 | 2–4 |
| | 2–5 | 46:22 – K. Swanson (Lindahl) |
| | 2–6 | 46:22 – Vandenbussche (Hanson) |
| | 2–7 | 48:50 – Fussy (Battles) |
| | 2–8 | 59:31 – Battles (Greene) (PP1) |

4 min
Penalties
6 min
32
Shots
57

==== Bronze medal game ====
| 20 January 2025; 16:00 | Japan | 2–1 (1–1, 1–0, 0–0) | Slovakia | Palasport Tazzoli, Turin |

Game reference

Kiku Kobayashi
Goalies
Andrea Rišianová
Referees:
(Germany) Caroline Butt
(Italy) Melissa Boverio
Linesmen:
(Finland) Aino Ranki
(Slovakia) Eva Mária Moleková

| Suzuki (Sasaki) – 00:10 | 1–0 |
| | 1–1 | 14:16 – Kúbeková (L. Šulíková, Nemčeková) |
| Chujo (Tsutsumi, Hayakawa) – 20:49 | 2–1 |

2 min
Penalties
8 min
32
Shots
13

==== Gold medal game ====
| 20 January 2025; 20:00 | Canada | 1–2 OT (0–0, 0–0, 1–1) (OT: 0–1) | Czech Republic | Palasport Tazzoli, Turin |

Game reference

Grace Beer
Goalies
Julie Pejšová
Referees:
(United States) Taylor-Anne Hill
(Canada) Audrey-Anne Girard
Linesmen:
(United States) Amanda Ziola
(Germany) Julia Wagner

| | 0–1 | 51:49 – Bartáková (Malicka) |
| Mercier (Herrfort) – 52:29 | 1–1 |
| | 1–2 | 76:21 – Vaníčková (Haasová, Bartáková) |

0 min
Penalties
4 min
52
Shots
16

=== Final standings ===
| Pos | Team | Pld | W | OTW | OTL | L | GF | GA | GD | Pts | Final Result |
|---|---|---|---|---|---|---|---|---|---|---|---|
| 1 | Czech Republic | 5 | 4 | 1 | 0 | 0 | 26 | 6 | +20 | 14 | Winner |
| 2 | Canada | 5 | 4 | 0 | 1 | 0 | 40 | 4 | +36 | 13 | Runner-Up |
| 3 | Japan | 5 | 3 | 0 | 0 | 2 | 17 | 8 | +9 | 9 | Third Place |
| 4 | Slovakia | 5 | 2 | 0 | 0 | 3 | 30 | 13 | +17 | 6 | Fourth Place |
| 5 | United States | 5 | 3 | 0 | 0 | 2 | 30 | 13 | +17 | 9 | Fifth Place Game |
| 6 | Kazakhstan | 5 | 1 | 0 | 0 | 4 | 7 | 37 | −30 | 3 | Fifth Place Game |
| 7 | Chinese Taipei | 5 | 2 | 0 | 0 | 3 | 19 | 26 | −7 | 6 | Seventh Place Game |
| 8 | Great Britain | 5 | 0 | 0 | 0 | 5 | 0 | 62 | −62 | 0 | Seventh Place Game |

Source: FISU

=== Statistics ===
==== Scoring leaders ====
List shows the top-ten point scorers, sorted by points, then goals.

GP = Games played; G = Goals; A = Assists; Pts = Points; +/− = Plus/minus; PIM = Penalties in minutes; POS = Position

| Rank | | Player | GP | G | A | Pts | +/− | PIM | POS |
|---|---|---|---|---|---|---|---|---|---|
| 1 | (Czech Republic) | Barbora Bartáková | 5 | 8 | 5 | 13 | +10 | 2 | F |
| 2 | (Canada) | Leah Herrfort | 5 | 7 | 5 | 12 | +13 | 8 | F |
| 3 | (Slovakia) | Lívia Kúbeková | 5 | 5 | 6 | 11 | +12 | 2 | F |
| 4 | (Czech Republic) | Hana Haasová | 4 | 3 | 8 | 11 | +7 | 0 | F |
| 5 | (Canada) | Émilie Lussier | 5 | 6 | 4 | 10 | +16 | 0 | F |
| 6 | (Slovakia) | Nikola Nemčeková | 5 | 6 | 3 | 9 | +11 | 2 | F |
| 7 | (Canada) | Madison Desmarais | 5 | 5 | 4 | 9 | +11 | 0 | F |
| 8 | (United States) | Brielle Fussy | 5 | 4 | 5 | 9 | +7 | 4 | F |
| 9 | (United States) | Haley Battles | 5 | 6 | 2 | 8 | +8 | 4 | F |
| 10 | (Canada) | Erica Plourde | 5 | 4 | 3 | 7 | +10 | 0 | F |

==== Goaltenders ====
Goaltenders playing at least forty percent of their team's minutes are included in this list, sorted by save percentage.

TOI = Time on ice (minutes:seconds); SOG = Shots on goal; GA = Goals against; Sv% = Save percentage; GAA = Goals against average; SO = Shutouts

| Rank | | Player | TOI | SOG | GA | Sv% | GAA | SO |
|---|---|---|---|---|---|---|---|---|
| 1 | (United States) | Rieley Jessie-Gerelli | 192:18 | 76 | 2 | 97.37 | 0.62 | 2 |
| 2 | (Czech Republic) | Julie Pejšová | 239:12 | 103 | 3 | 97.09 | 0.75 | 1 |
| 3 | (Japan) | Kiku Kobayashi | 237:31 | 84 | 6 | 92.86 | 1.52 | 2 |
| 4 | (Slovakia) | Andrea Rišianová | 266:59 | 130 | 13 | 90.00 | 2.92 | 1 |
| 5 | (Chinese Taipei) | Chung Ai | 236:00 | 169 | 18 | 89.35 | 4.58 | 2 |
| 6 | (Canada) | Grace Beer | 136:21 | 18 | 2 | 88.89 | 0.88 | 1 |
| 7 | (United Kingdom) | Holly Bihun | 170:30 | 192 | 27 | 85.94 | 9.50 | 0 |
| 8 | (Kazakhstan) | Polina Govtva | 232:26 | 182 | 28 | 84.62 | 7.23 | 0 |
| 9 | (United Kingdom) | Georgia Ashton | 129:29 | 151 | 35 | 76.82 | 16.22 | 0 |

=== Rosters ===
| Rank | Team | Roster |
|---|---|---|
| 1st place, gold medalist(s) | Czech Republic | Goaltenders: Barbora Dalecká, Kateřina Dvořáková, Julie Pejšová; Defencemen: Viktorie Chladová, Denisa Habartová (A), Anežka Hračová, Anna Kotounová (C), Eliška Vaněčková, Anna Vaníčková, Adéla Wojnarová; Forwards: Barbora Bartáková, Natálie Brichová, Lucie Eignerová, Hana Haasová, Alexandra Halounová (A), Sandra Halounová, Dominika Malicka, Markéta Mazancová, Tereza Mazancová, Kateřina Petřeková, Patricie Škorpíková, Anna Václavková; Head coach: Jan Lucák; Assistant coach: Roman Kosina |
| 2nd place, silver medalist(s) | Canada | Goaltenders: Grace Beer, Kaitlyn Ross, Jordyn Verbeek; Defencemen: Alexandra-Anne Boyer, Sophia Gaskell, Mackenzie Keenan, Abigail MacKenzie, Emma Potter, Alexandria Spence; Forwards: Madison Desmarais, Malory Dominico, Leah Herrfort (A), Aliya Jomha, Émilie Lavoie, Émilie Lussier, Jamie Magoffin, Sydney Mercier, Ekaterina Pelowich (A), Erica Plourde, Gabrielle Santerre, Scout Watkins Southward (C); Head coach: Kelly Paton; Assistant coach: Addison Miles-Abbott |
| 3rd place, bronze medalist(s) | Japan | Goaltenders: Sakura Ito, Hana Kitajima, Kiku Kobayashi; Defencemen: Yuka Chujo, Sarasa Kishibe, Sakura Kitamura, Haruna Nomura, Ayaka Tomiuchi, Momoka Yamamoto, Aiko Yoshikawa; Forwards: Yu Hatade, Anju Hayakawa, Shieru Higuchi (A), Minami Kamada (A), Ruka Kiyokawa, Komomo Ito, Riko Matsumoto, Marin Nagaoka, Riri Noro, Ami Sasaki, Kaho Suzuki, Masaki Tanabe, Kyoka Tsutsumi (C); Head coach: Yujiro Nakajimaya; Assistant coach: Haruna Yoneyama |
| 4 | Slovakia | Goaltenders: Simona Macková, Andrea Rišianová; Defencemen: Diana Fortunová, Lea Giertlová, Nikola Janeková, Emília Leskovjanská, Emma Plankenauerová, Alžbeta Šulíková, Laura Šulíková (A), Sofia Vysokajová; Forwards: Júlia Čilíková, Hana Fančovičová (A), Lea Glosíková, Lucia Halušková (C), Romana Halušková, Nina Hudáková, Ema Jašková, Lívia Kúbeková, Annamaria Lodňanová, Sylvia Maťašová, Nikola Nemčeková, Kristína Šimnová; Head coach: Miroslav Mosnár; Assistant coaches: Roman Maga, Iveta Frühauf |
| 5 | United States | Goaltenders: Quinn Eatinger, Rieley Jessie-Gerelli, Sandrine Ponnath; Defencemen: Paige Ackerman, Zoe Dupuis, Keegan Gustafson, Elle McKenna (C), Gianna Miranda, Amy Palaian, Raya Vandenbussche; Forwards: Haley Battles, Kylie Brown, Brielle Fussy, Allison Greene, Halle Hansen (A), Lucy Hanson, Abigail Jeffers, Julia Lindahl, Emily Maliszewski, Sydney Paulsen, Kelsey Swanson, Lula Swanson, Makenzie Villard (A); Head coach: Lindsey Ellis; Assistant coaches: Jenna Trubiano, Anna Quattro |
| 6 | Kazakhstan | Goaltenders: Polina Govtva, Diana Iskakova; Defencemen: Karina Amirova, Aleksandra Bystrova, Almira Ibragimova, Alina Ivanchenko, Aruzhan Kenessova, Darya Khokhlova, Katrin Meskini, Anna Pyatkova (C), Alina Umrikhina, Polina Yakovleva; Forwards: Darya Adilkhan, Yekaterina Kutsenko, Polina Mokina, Madianna Nussupova, Regina Saltyssova, Dilnaz Sayakhatkyzy, Munira Sayakhatkyzy (A), Alexandra Shegay (A), Karina Sulaimanova, Sholpan Tokkozha; Head coach: Alexandr Tebenkov; Assistant coach: Zhassulan Orazbayev |
| 7 | Chinese Taipei | Goaltenders: Chiu Yi-Ting, Chung Ai; Defencemen: Chan Chiao-yu, Hsu Yu-tong, Lin Yang-chi (C), Sha Yun-yun (A), Yu Chia-lung; Forwards: Chang En-ni, Chang En-wei (A), Chung Ching, Fan Chih-chieh, Huang Yun-chu, Kao Wei-ting, Lin Yi-ni, Liu Pei-chen, Tan Su-ting, Tao Sing-lin, Wu Ji-cih, Yeh Pei-han, Yeh Ping-hsin; Head coach: Huang Jen-hung; Assistant coaches: Hsieh Chen-guang, Chang Wei-ting |
| 8 | Great Britain | Goaltenders: Georgia Ashton, Holly Bihun; Defencemen: Sophie Games, Jazmin Little, Kaitlyn Morrison (A), Jessica Mulloy (A), Grace Ralphs, Matilda Revell, Caitlin Stocks, Madison Troup, Madison Wright; Forwards: Chloe Carter, Leonie Charles, Eleanor Cooper, Charlotte Cramp, Amy Kingsbury, Emily Luck, Vivian McGee, Ketziah Robinson, Charlotte Sims, Claire Turnbull (C), Ishbel Wright; Head coach: Ryan Rathbone; Assistant coaches: Abigail Culshaw, Aisling Rafter |

Source: FISU
