= Tereza Mazancová =

Czech ice hockey player (born 2002)

- Born: 15 September 2002 (age 24) Mladá Boleslav, Czech Republic
- Height: 162 cm (5 ft 4 in)
- Weight: 64 kg (141 lb; 10 st 1 lb)
- Position: Forward
- Shoots: Left
- Extraliga team Former teams: HC Baník Příbram: HC Slavia Praha; Bílí Tygři Liberec; HC Berounské Lvice
- National team: Czech Republic
- Playing career: 2015–present
Medal record
World University Games
Gold medal – first place	2025 Torino	Ice hockey
Bronze medal – third place	2023 Lake Placid	Ice hockey

Tereza Mazancová (born 15 September 2002) is a Czech ice hockey player. She has played in the Czech Women's Extraliga (Czech: Extraliga žen) with HC Baník Příbram since 2018.

== International play ==
As a junior player with the Czech national under-18 team, she participated in the IIHF Women's U18 World Championships in 2018, 2019, and 2020.

Mazancová represented the Czech Republic at the 2021 IIHF Women's World Championship.
