= Kaho Suzuki =

Japanese ice hockey player

Kaho Suzuki 鈴木 花歩
- Born: 2 February 2002 (age 24) Kushiro, Japan
- Height: 1.60 m (5 ft 3 in)
- Weight: 53 kg (117 lb; 8 st 5 lb)
- Position: Centre
- Shoots: Right
- JWIHL team Former teams: Seibu Princess Rabbits; Daishin IHC
- National team: Japan
- Playing career: 2018–present
Medal record
World University Games
Bronze medal – third place	2025 Torino	Ice hockey

Kaho Suzuki (鈴木 花歩, Suzuki Kaho; born 2 February 2002) is a Japanese ice hockey player and member of the Japanese national team, currently playing with the Seibu Princess Rabbits in the Women's Japan Ice Hockey League (WJIHL) and All-Japan Women's Ice Hockey Championship.

She represented Japan at the 2019 IIHF Women's World Championship.
