= Göteborg HC =

Ice hockey club in Gothenburg, Sweden

Göteborg Hockey Club
- City: Angered, Gothenburg, Sweden
- Founded: 2014
- Home arena: Angered Arena
- Colours: Black, red, white, tan
- General manager: Mikael Gabrielsson
- Head coach: Snorri Sigurbergsson
- Captain: Alexa McMillan
- Website: Official website

Göteborg Hockey Club, abbreviated as Göteborg HC or GHC, are an ice hockey club in Angered, a borough of Gothenburg (Swedish: Göteborg) in southwestern Sweden. They played in the Swedish Women's Hockey League (SDHL), the top Swedish women's hockey league, during 2017 to November 2022. In early November 2022, the club withdrew from the SDHL.

== History ==
Göteborg HC was founded in 2014 and its representative team earned promotion to the SDHL in 2017. The team finished the regular season in last place during each of the five seasons they completed in the SDHL but they managed to avoid relegation each time.

The club earned its first win in the SDHL in November 2017, with a 4–2 victory over SDE Hockey.

In October 2020, goaltender Frida Axell became the first Göteborg HC player to earn a call-up to the senior Swedish national team.

== In the community ==
In addition to the senior representative team, Göteborg HC operates a free youth hockey school at Angered Arena on Sundays, offering all-girls and coed classes. Frölunda Hockey Club of the Swedish Hockey League has donated funds to GHC to help support, as Frölunda's Academy and Development Manager Mikael Ström described, “the important work GHC is doing in Angered.” Regarding Göteborg HC's hockey school and its partnership with Frölunda HC, GHC president Jan Mellgren said, “We think it is important to build hockey in multicultural areas and we have a good collaboration with Frölunda in that work.”

== Season-by-season results ==
This list includes all seasons completed by Göteborg HC since gaining promotion to the SDHL.

Code explanation: Finish = Rank at end of regular season; GP = Games played, W = Wins (3 points), OTW = Overtime wins (2 points), OTL = Overtime losses (1 point), L = Losses, GF = Goals for, GA = Goals against, Pts = Points, Top scorer: Points (Goals+Assists)

Season	League	Regular season										Postseason results
Season	League	Finish	GP	W	OTW	OTL	L	GF	GA	Pts	Top scorer	Postseason results
2017-18	SDHL	10th	36	4	1	2	29	67	178	16	(Canada) G. Bannon 33 (18+15)	Saved in relegation playoff
2018-19	SDHL	10th	36	1	1	2	32	31	212	10	(Canada) A. MacMillan 11 (7+4)	Saved in relegation playoff
2019-20	SDHL	10th	36	2	2	4	28	52	140	14	(Sweden) H. Thuvik 17 (9+8)	Saved in relegation playoff
2020-21	SDHL	10th	36	3	0	2	31	46	159	11	(Canada) H. Clayton-Carroll 16 (8+8)	Relegation playoff cancelled
2021-22	SDHL	10th	36	0	0	1	35	40	186	1	(Czech Republic) H. Haasová 14 (11+3)	Saved in relegation playoff
2022-23	SDHL	10th	13	1	0	1	11	8	60	4	(United States) J. Costa 4 (3+1)	Withdrew during regular season

== Players and personnel ==
=== 2022–23 roster ===
As of 4 November 2022 (Note: Approximate roster and staff on 4 November 2022, the date Göteborg HC announced withdrawal from the SDHL. Most players subsequently transferred to other clubs.)

No.	Nat	Player	Pos	S/G	Age	Acquired	Birthplace
9	(Canada)	Jessica Bélanger (A)	F	L	29	2022	Sherbrooke, Quebec, Canada
23	(United States)	Rebecca Brown (A)	F	R	28	2022	Steamboat Springs, Colorado, United States
18	(United States)	Jennifer Costa	F	L	26	2022	Pawtucket, Rhode Island, United States
86	(Sweden)	Andrea Dellblad	D	L	42	2022	
22	(Sweden)	Molly Eljas	D	L	23	2022	Björbo, Dalarna, Sweden
25	(Canada)	Sarah Gaiser	F	L	23	2022	Calgary, Alberta, Canada
24	(Sweden)	Mimmi Gill (A)	F	L	23	2022	Västerås, Västmanland, Sweden
3	(Sweden)	Moa Gustavsson	F	R	20	2022	
30	(United Kingdom)	Nicole Jackson	G	L	33	2016	Oldham, England, United Kingdom
2	(Sweden)	Anny Källum	F	L	39	2022	Gothenburg, Sweden
10	(Canada)	Alexa McMillan (C)	D	L	27	2022	Edmonton, Alberta, Canada
21	(Switzerland)	Anna Neuenschwander	F	L	25	2022	Davos, Grisons, Switzerland
31	(Canada)	Loryn Porter	G	L	26	2022	North Bay, Ontario, Canada
12	(Japan)	Fumika Sasano	D	L	29	2022	Aomori, Tōhoku, Japan
19	(Czech Republic)	Klára Seroiszková	D	L	25	2020	Karviná, Moravskoslezský kraj, Czechia
16	(Sweden)	Filippa Wahlfried	F	L	25	2022	
17	(Sweden)	Julia Weckström	F	L	23	2022	Uppsala, Uppland, Sweden
66	(Czech Republic)	Anna Zíková	D	L	28	2022	Český Těšín, Moravskoslezský kraj, Czechia
86	(Sweden)	Sara Åkerlund	D	L	30	2022	Hudiksvall, Hälsingland, Sweden
2	(Sweden)	Jill Öhlin	F	L	20	2022	
–	(Sweden)	Elsa Öhrfelt	F	L	21	2022	

Coaching staff and team personnel

- Head coach: Snorri Sigurbergsson
- Assistant coach: Henry Vilhelmsson
- Assistant coach: Johan Vilhelmsson
- Goaltending coach: Dennis Hedstrom
- Mental coach: Barbro Sundberg
- Medical team: Ida Leipe & Gert Norell
- Equipment manager: Christoffer Gustafsson

=== Team captaincy history ===
- Anna Borgfeldt, 2017–2020
- Margot Möllersten, 2020–2022
- Alexa McMillan, 2022

=== Head coaches ===
- Jan Mellgren, 2014–2016
- Heini Lundin, 2017–18
- Oscar Annell, 2018–2020
- Stefanie McKeough, 2020 – 13 October 2020
- Heini Lundin, 14 October 2020 – 11 January 2022
- Henry Vilhelmsson, 14 January 2022 – 22 April 2022
- Snorri Sigurbergsson, 22 April 2022 – 4 November 2022
