= Hana Haasová =

Czech ice hockey player (born 2003)

- Born: 7 August 2003 (age 23)
- Height: 165 cm (5 ft 5 in)
- Weight: 64 kg (141 lb; 10 st 1 lb)
- Position: Forward
- Shoots: Left
- SDHL team Former teams: Djurgårdens IF; Göteborg HC; Leksands IF
- National team: Czech Republic
- Playing career: 2021–present
Medal record
World University Games
Gold medal – first place	2025 Torino	Ice hockey

Hana Haasová (born 7 August 2003) is a Czech ice hockey player for Djurgårdens IF of the Swedish Women's Hockey League (SDHL) and a member of the Czech Republic women's national ice hockey team. She previously played for Göteborg HC and Leksands IF.

== Playing career ==
Haasová began her ice hockey career for Göteborg HC during the 2021–22 season, where she recorded 11 goals and three assists in 36 games. She then joined Leksands IF for the 2022–23 season, where she recorded 12 goals and two assists in 23 games. On 12 June 2023, she signed with Djurgårdens IF. During the 2023–24 season, she recorded 12 goals and nine assists in 36 games. In June 2024, she signed a one-year contract extension with Djurgårdens. During the 2024–25 season, she recorded four goals and nine assists in 32 games.

== International play ==
Haasová represented the Czech Republic at the IIHF U18 Women's World Championship in 2019 and 2020, where she recorded seven goals and two assists in ten games.

In January 2025, she represented the Czech Republic at the 2025 Winter World University Games where she recorded three goals and eight assists in four games and won a gold medal. On 31 March 2025, she was selected to represent Czechia at the 2025 IIHF Women's World Championship.

== Personal life ==
Haasová's father, Rostislav, is an ice hockey coach.

== Career statistics ==
=== Regular season and playoffs ===
			Regular season					Playoffs
Season	Team	League	GP	G	A	Pts	PIM	GP	G	A	Pts	PIM
2021–22	Göteborg HC	SDHL	36	11	3	14	4	3	4	0	4	0
2022–23	Leksands IF	SDHL	23	12	2	14	0	—	—	—	—	—
2023–24	Djurgårdens IF	SDHL	36	12	9	21	2	5	1	1	2	0
2024–25	Djurgårdens IF	SDHL	32	4	9	13	2	4	1	1	2	0
SDHL totals			127	39	23	62	8	12	6	2	8	0

=== International ===
Year	Team	Event	Result	GP	G	A	Pts	PIM
2019	Czech Republic	U18	7th	6	3	1	4	0
2020	Czech Republic	U18	6th	4	4	1	5	2
2025	Czech Republic	WC	4th	1	0	0	0	0
Junior totals				10	7	2	9	12
Senior totals				1	0	0	0	0
