= University School of Physical Education in Kraków =

The University School of Physical Education in Krakow
- Akademia Wychowania Fizycznego w Krakowie
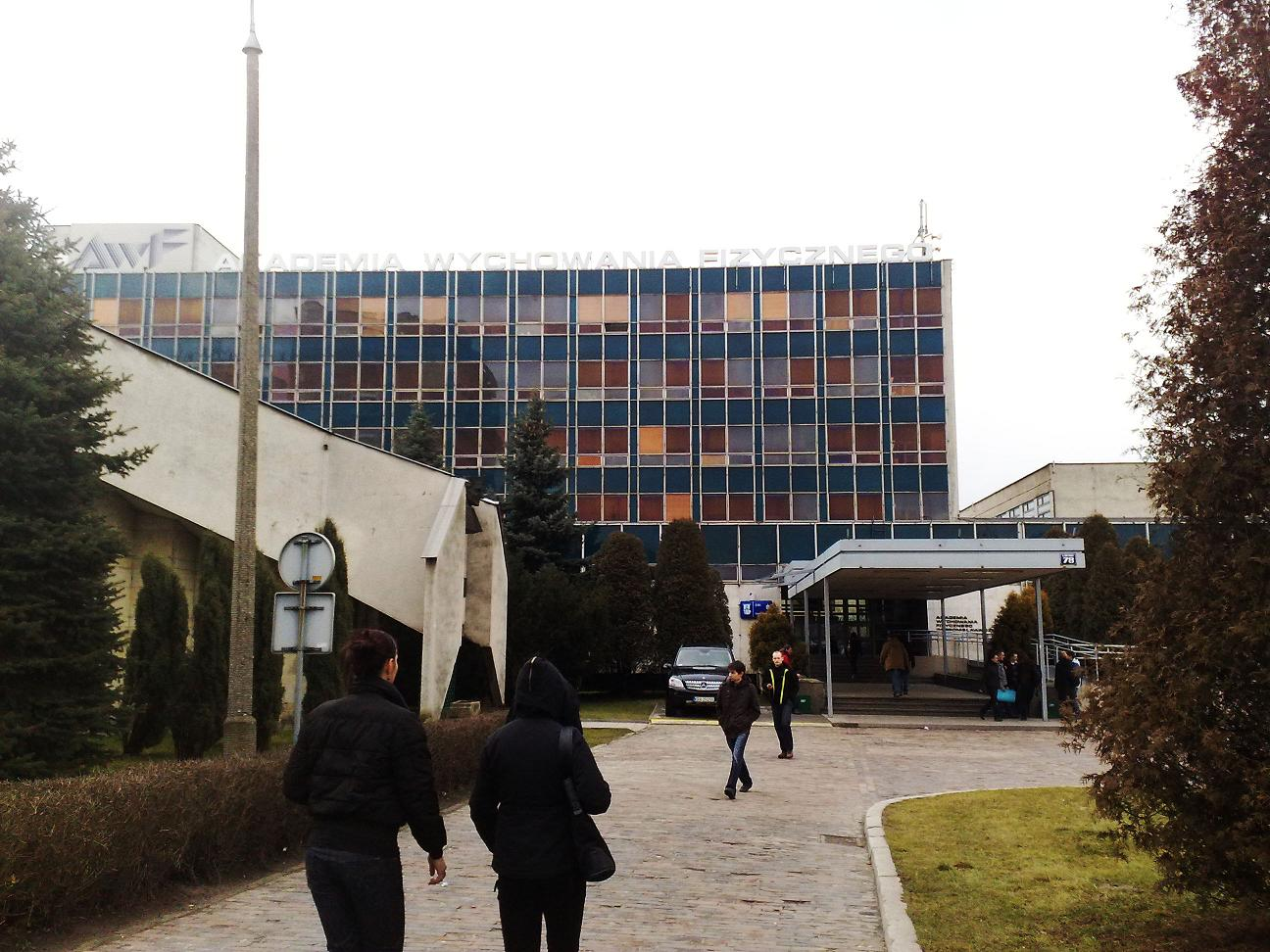
- Type: Public university
- Established: 1893/1950
- Rector: Professor Andrzej Klimek
- Students: 3,778 (December 2023)
- Address: al. Jana Pawła II 78, 31-571 Kraków, Kraków, Poland
- Campus: Urban
- Affiliations: SOCRATES
- Website: http://www.awf.krakow.pl

The University School of Physical Education in Krakow (AKF; Polish: Akademia Kultury Fizycznej im. Bronisława Czecha w Krakowie, formerly AWF; Polish: Akademia Wychowania Fizycznego w Krakowie) is an institution of higher education in Kraków, Poland.

== History ==
The establishment of the Kraków AWF is associated with the 2-year Scientific Course for Candidates for Gymnastics Teachers in Secondary Schools and Teacher Training Colleges, established in 1893 at the Jagiellonian University. The course was conducted near the Faculty of Medicine of the Jagiellonian University. In 1913, it was transformed into a 2-year Physical Education College, which, in addition to educating teachers, organized lectures and practical exercises for all university students. It was the first such institution of university education of PE teachers in Poland.

The next step towards university education of PE teachers was the 3-year Physical Education School, established in the interwar period in Poland (1927) at the Faculty of Medicine of the Jagiellonian University. In 1950, the School was transformed into an independent Higher School of Physical Education. Four-year master's studies were also introduced (1954). In 1972, the school was given the name: Academy of Physical Education, and shortly after that it was named after Bronisław Czech. In 1970, the school obtained the right to award the degree of doctor and the degree of habilitated doctor in 1987.

== See also ==
- List of universities in Poland
