= Aneta Kobryń =

Polish Para cross-country skier (born 2000)

Personal information
- Born: 16 August 2000 (age 26) Radziejów, Poland

Sport
- Sport: Para cross-country skiing
- Disability: Visually impaired
- Disability class: NS2
- Events: Sprint, 10 km

Achievements and titles
- Paralympic finals: Milan/Cortina 2026
Medal record
Women's Para cross-country skiing
Representing Poland
2025 Winter World University Games
Bronze medal – third place	2025 Turin	10 km free
Bronze medal – third place	2025 Turin	Sprint classic

Aneta Kobryń (born 16 August 2000) is a Polish Para cross-country skier who competes in the visually impaired category. She represents Poland in international competitions and skis with guide Bartłomiej Puto.

== Biography ==
Kobryń was born on 16 August 2000 in Radziejów, Poland. She competes in para cross-country skiing in the visually impaired category and is guided by Bartłomiej Puto in international competitions.

She is a student at the Józef Piłsudski University of Physical Education in Warsaw. During the 2025 Winter World University Games in Turin, Kobryń won bronze medals in para cross-country skiing events, including the women's 10 km freestyle and the sprint classic race. She competed with guide Katarzyna Witek during the competition.

Kobryń was the first Polish para-athlete to compete in para cross-country skiing at the Winter World University Games. She finished third in the race and described the experience as an important moment in her sporting career.

In 2026 she was selected to represent Poland at the 2026 Winter Paralympics in Milan and Cortina d'Ampezzo. During the nomination ceremony for the Polish Paralympic team she was chosen as the flag bearer for the Polish delegation.

== Results ==
=== Winter World University Games ===
Year	Venue	Results
2025	Italy Turin	3rd 10 km free 3rd Sprint classic

=== World Championships ===
Year	Venue	Results
2022	Norway Lillehammer	6th Relay; 12th Sprint
2025	Italy Toblach	6th 10 km interval start classic 7th 20 km interval start free 7th Open relay
2025	Norway Trondheim	8th Sprint classic
