= East European Academy of Applied Sciences in Białystok =

- Wschodnioeuropejska Akademia Nauk Stosowanych w Białymstoku
- Type: Private
- Established: August 17, 1993
- Rector: Prof. dr hab. Józef Szabłowski
- Address: Ciepła 40, Białystok, Poland; 53°08′29″N 23°10′05″E
- Campus: Urban
- Affiliations: Socrates-Erasmus
- Website: www.wsfiz.edu.pl Building details
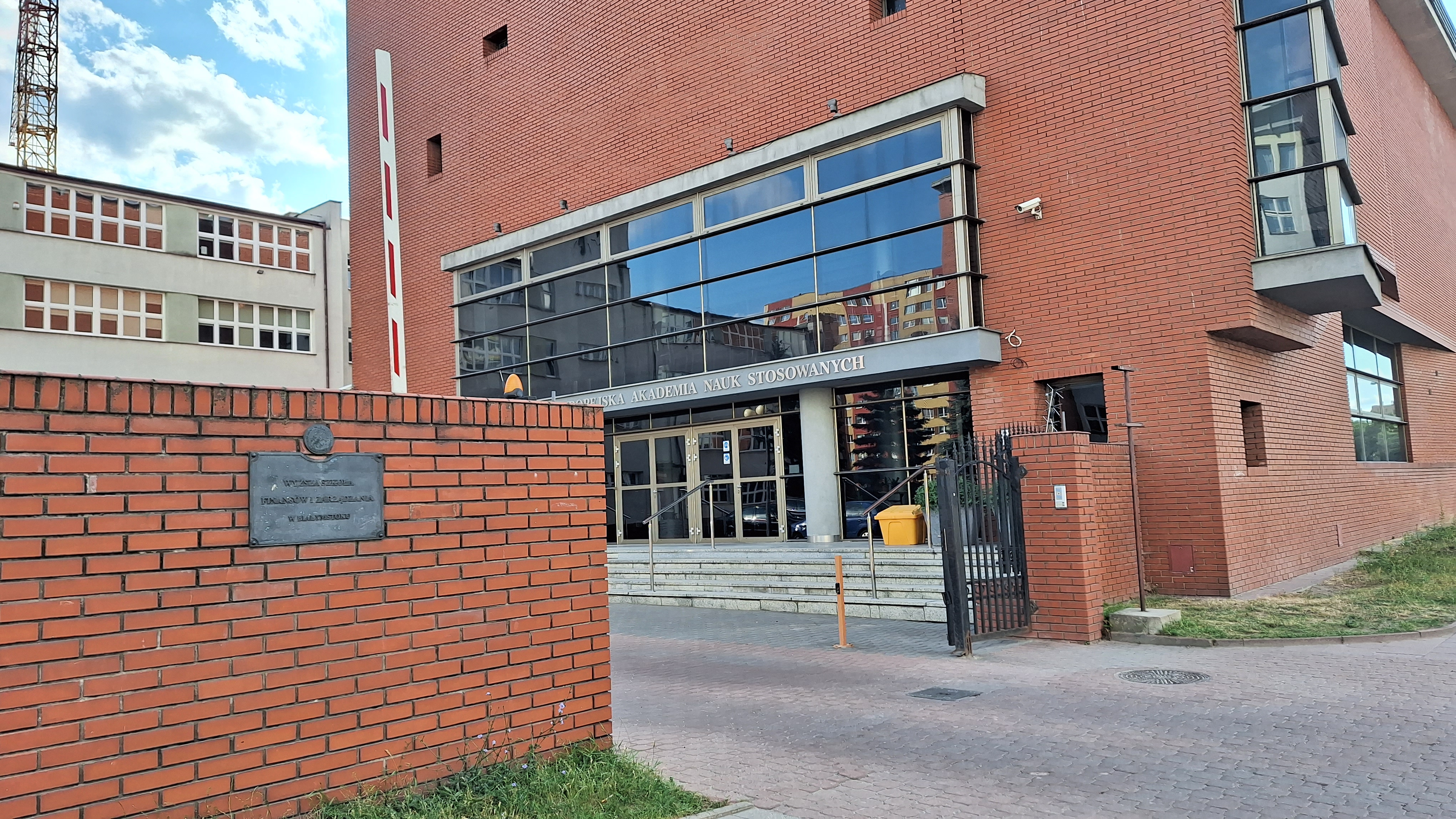

East European Academy of Applied Sciences in Białystok (Polish: Wschodnioeuropejska Akademia Nauk Stosowanych w Białymstoku) is a non-government higher education institute in Białystok. It is the oldest of its type in Podlaskie Voivodeship and one of the oldest non-public universities in Poland.

== History ==
The East European Institute of Economy in Białystok (Polish: Wschodnioeuropejski Instytut Gospodarki w Białymstoku) applied to the Ministry of National Education to establish the University of Finance and Management in Białystok, which on August 17, 1993 was entered into the Register of Non-State Universities under item 23. About 800 students were admitted to the first year of full-time and extramural studies. The first rector was prof. dr hab. Jozef Szabłowski. In 1993, the university purchased facilities after the liquidated Clothing Works. M. Nowotki "Bielpo" at Ciepla Street.

In 1996, on the initiative of Rector Józef Szabłowski, a university choir was established, whose founder and first conductor was Agnieszka Duda-Bienie. Since September 26, 1996, the Scientific Publishing House has been operating at WSFiZ.

In 1997, by virtue of a resolution of the Senate, two faculties were created: Finance and IT and Management and Marketing.

In 2010, the University had 4 faculties and offered 7 fields of study. On December 30, 2022, in accordance with the decision of the Minister of Education and Science, the University of Finance and Management in Białystok changed its name to East European Academy of Applied Sciences in Białystok (WANS).

== Staff ==
- Professors: 75
- Habilitated doctors: 68
- Lecturers: 47
- Teachers (total): 200

== Diplomas and degrees ==
Master's degree courses in: Management and Marketing, Finance and Banking, and Regional Studies. In addition, 13 Bachelor programmes.

== See also ==
- American Academy of Financial Management
- Academy of Finance
- Academy of Financial Trading
