= Pinerolo Palaghiaccio =

Curling venue for the 2006 Winter Olympics

Coordinates: 44°53′28″N 7°20′55″E

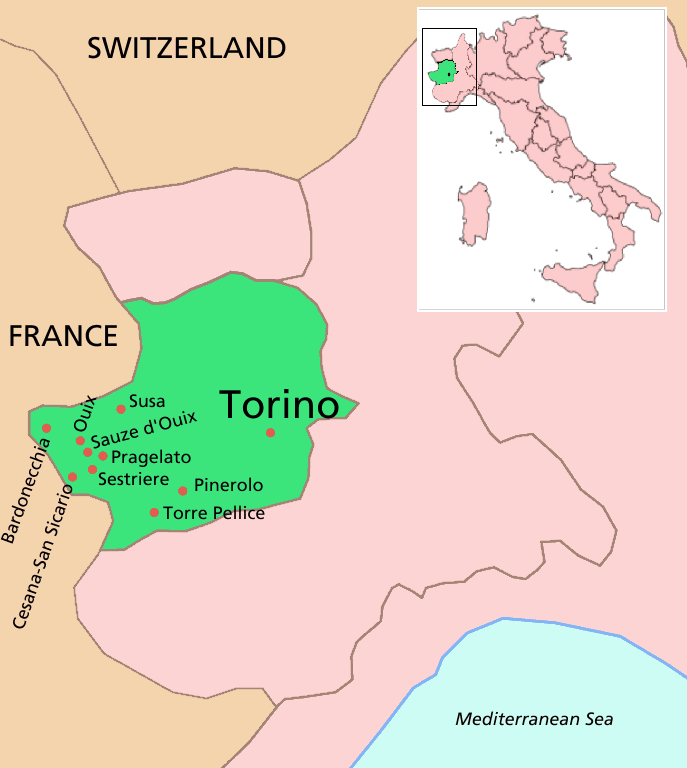
Location of the town shown on the map

Pinerolo Palaghiaccio is a 2,000-seat indoor arena located in Pinerolo, Italy. The venue hosted the curling competitions for the 2006 Winter Olympics in neighbouring Turin.
