= Gabriele d'Annunzio University =

University located in Chieti and Pescara, Italy

Coordinates: 42.3696°N 14.1457°E

- Università degli Studi "Gabriele d'Annunzio"
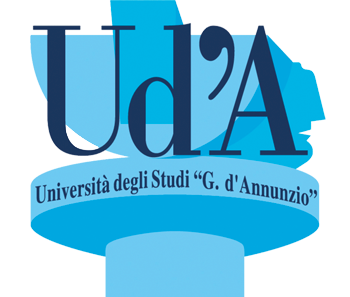
- Latin: Universitas Studiorum Adriatica
- Type: Public
- Established: 23 June 1960; 65 years ago
- Academic affiliations: Netval Group; Long Term Ecological Research Network; Mediterranean Universities Union; European University Association; European Network of Physiotherapy in Higher Education
- Rector: Liborio Stuppia
- Director: Giovanni Cucullo
- Academic staff: 1,336 (Fall 2016)
- Students: 25,268 (Fall 2016)
- Undergraduates: 21,368 (Fall 2016)
- Postgraduates: 3,900 (Fall 2016)
- Location: Chieti and Pescara, Italy
- Campus: Urban; Chieti Campus: 48.9 acres (19.8 ha); Pescara Campus: 6.29 acres (2.55 ha)
- Colors: Green
- Nickname: CUS Chieti
- Website: www.unich.it

Gabriele d'Annunzio University (Italian: Università degli Studi Gabriele d'Annunzio, UdA) is a public research university located in Chieti and Pescara, neighbouring cities in the region of Abruzzo, Italy. Established in 1960 as a higher education institute and named after writer and poet Gabriele D'Annunzio, it was officially recognised as an independent university in 1965 by Minister Luigi Gui.

The university is formed from a variety of institutions which include thirteen academic departments organised into two schools. It provides undergraduate, graduate and post-graduate education, in addition to a range of international programs in multiple fields of study. Research is a component of each academic division, receiving funds for its scientific investigation from national and international institutions.

D'Annunzio University's main campus in Chieti features an eclectic mix of buildings encompassing 48.9 acres. A satellite campus is located in Pescara, while a distance learning centre is situated in Torrevecchia Teatina. It is one of the youngest national university in Italy to enter the U.S. News & World Report of the world's best universities.

== History ==
=== Early years ===
In 1955, the municipal and provincial administrations of Chieti and Pescara, neighbouring cities in the region of Abruzzo in Central Italy, met to discuss about the foundation of a consortium in order to establish a non-state-owned university in the medieval town of Chieti. Their proposal, pursued by engineer Filippo de Apulia, was submitted to the Ministry of Public Education of Italy on 28 November 1955. The creation of the University Consortium of Abruzzi was officially approved in 1960 by the Prefect of Chieti, following the participation of the Chambers of Commerce and the Board of the Banks of the town, in association with over sixty municipalities from the region.

In 1961, the faculty of letters and philosophy was inaugurated at the National Archaeology Museum of Abruzzo by the technical organising committee, chaired by Professor Ettore Paratore. It preceded the inauguration ceremony of the free university courses that took place on 12 November 1961. The following month, commerce and economics courses were introduced with an adjoining foreign languages and literatures course, following an opening ceremony held at the Marble Hall of the Province of Pescara, in the presence of Professor Carlo Izzo.

=== Foundation ===
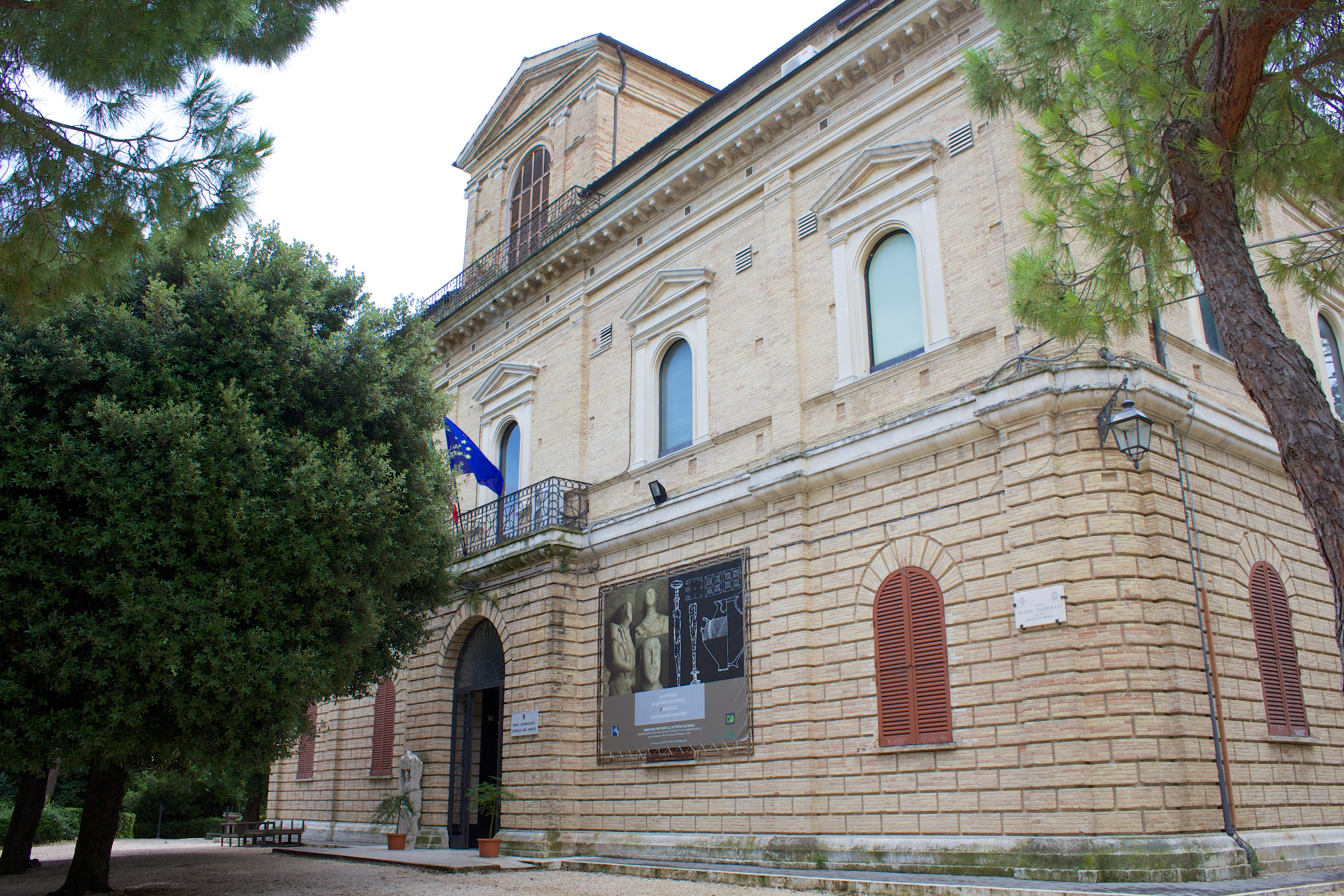
National Archaeology Museum of Abruzzo, where the first faculty of D'Annunzio University was established.

In January 1963, an official request for the establishment of the Free University of Abruzzi was proposed by the organising committee, prompting the institutions of Chieti, Pescara and Teramo to debate the unification of the three university consortia into a single interprovincial consortium. On 3 March 1965, Minister of Public Education Luigi Gui signed the decree of recognition of the Gabriele D'Annunzio Free University of Abruzzo, named after the Italian writer and poet from Pescara.

The registered administrative offices of the university and the rectorate were established in Chieti, along with the faculty of letters and philosophy; Pescara included the faculty of commerce and economics with an adjoining foreign languages and literatures course; the faculty of law was instituted in Teramo. Professor Renato Balzarini was elected as the first Rector of the university and chaired the first meeting of the board of trustees, which was originally composed of fourteen members.

The opening ceremony of the first academic year took place in Pescara on 19 March 1966, in the presence of the Minister Luigi Gui. During the following years, the university saw the inauguration of the faculty of medicine and surgery in Chieti, the institution of the faculties of architecture in Pescara and political sciences in Teramo. In addition, the course of foreign languages and literatures was finally established, after it definitely separated from the faculty of commerce and economics. In December 1979, Professor Aldo Bernardini was elected Rector.

=== Expansion ===
In April 1982, D'Annunzio Free University became state-supported, following the approval of the Senate of the Republic of Italy. It preceded the opening of the faculties of pharmacy, veterinary medicine, and natural sciences, which were placed in three provinces of the region. The seal of the university was inspired by a sculpture of Pietro Cascella located in the campuses of Chieti and Pescara; it reproduces the stylised form of the head of the Roman goddess of wisdom Minerva, placed on a simple base and bearing the words "Università degli Studi G. D'Annunzio", upon which the acronym "Ud'A" is superimposed. In June 1985, Professor Uberto Crescenti was elected Rector.

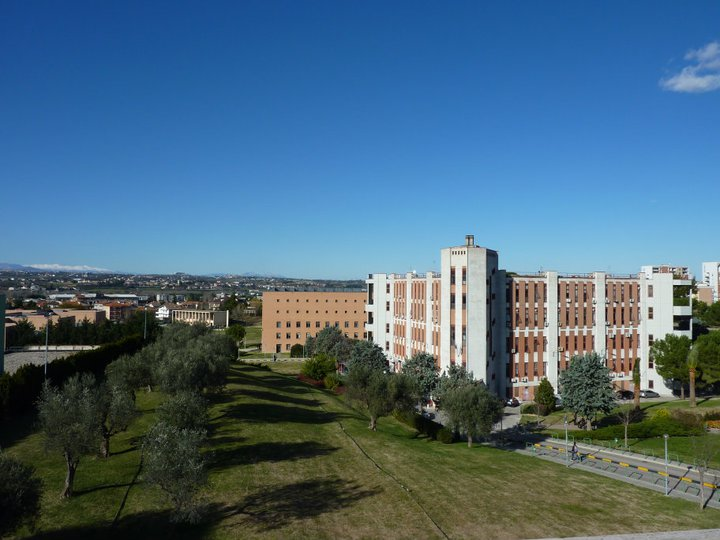
Madonna delle Piane campus in Chieti as seen from the Citadel of Science

In the following years, D'Annunzio University saw increased emphasis on research, reorganization of administrative structure and construction of new facilities, leading to the establishment of the Museum of Biomedical Sciences and the opening of a research and training hospital. On 20 February 1988, Minister Giovanni Galloni inaugurated the Viale Pindaro campus in Pescara. The faculties based in Teramo separated from D'Annunzio University in 1993, establishing the University of Teramo. The Institute of Hospitalisation and Treatment for Scientific Purposes was launched at D'Annunzio University by Minister of Health Rosy Bindi in early 2000.

The Continuing Education Centre was also founded as a permanent training centre in the town of Torrevecchia Teatina, while the Teacher Training School (SSIS) opened in Chieti. The Centre for Research in Aging, supported by the Ministry of Universities and Research, gained national relevance as the first Italian centre dedicated to research into healthy aging and age-related diseases. In 2002, the university opened four new faculties, with a consequent increase in student numbers that led to the creation of a second teaching centre at the Madonna delle Piane campus in Chieti.

The following year saw the birth of the D'Annunzio University Foundation and the official opening of the Centre for Research in Aging, which took place in the presence of Minister Letizia Moratti. In 2004, the centre was recognized with a special advisory status by the United Nations Economic and Social Council. The university later funded and promoted the Leonardo da Vinci University, based in Torrevecchia Teatina, which was legally recognised in 2004. It forms the online campus of D'Annunzio University and delivers its services exclusively online. Following the approval of the Gelmini's reform in 2012, all faculties were replaced by thirteen departments organized into two schools.

== Campus ==
=== Chieti ===
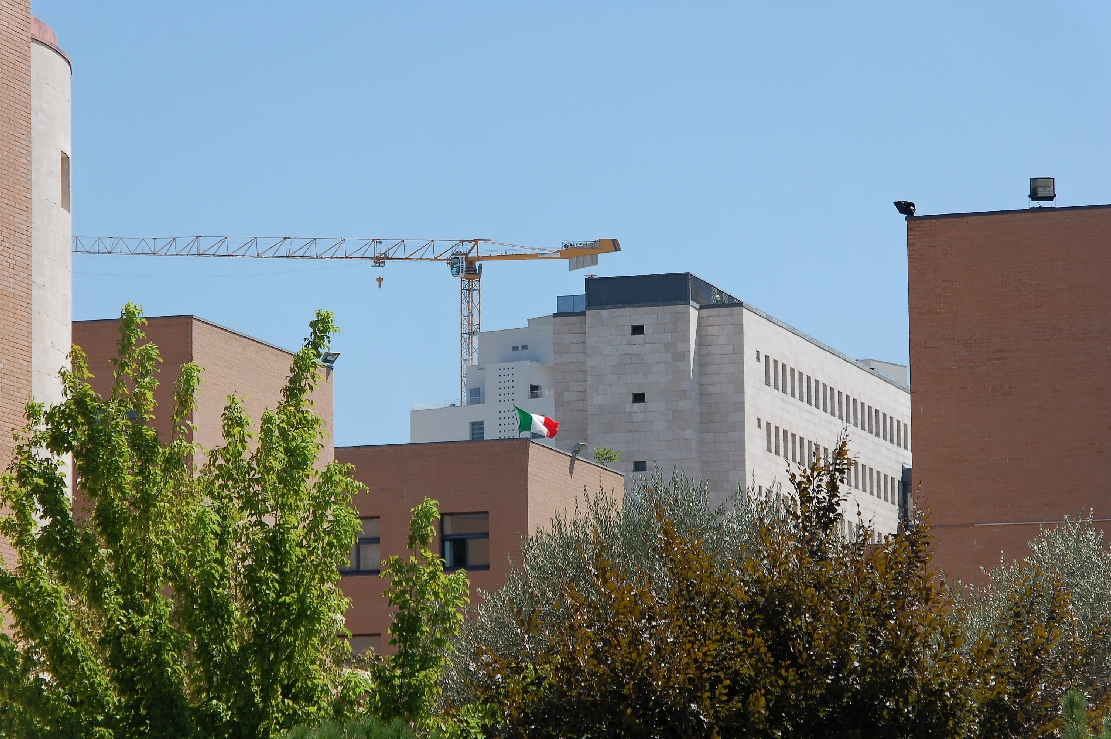
Department of Pharmacy in Chieti

D'Annunzio University's 48.9 acres (19.8 ha) main campus is centered on Madonna delle Piane in Chieti Scalo, about 3 miles (5 km) northwest of downtown Chieti. Its facilities are organised within a unitary structure which includes natural elements and pre-existing buildings. It is the statutory seat of the university and contains the central administrative offices, including the rectorate and general directorate. Most of the D'Annunzio University's academic programs are located on the campus in Madonna delle Piane, which houses two schools and seven departments including the School of Advanced Studies. It contains the main libraries of the university as well as five research centres.

It is the home of Rectorate Auditorium which serves as the university's main venue for music concerts, lectures, and academic ceremonies. Giardino dei Semplici is a botanical garden operated by the D'Annunzio University. It is located on the southwest corner of the campus in Madonna delle Piane and hosts a collection of over 400 medicinal plant species. The Nature Trail is an educational trail running across the campus area and covering 1.4 kilometres (0.87 mi). Many of the university's sports facilities are located in the campus.

D'Annunzio University provides housing for undergraduates, graduate students, and professional students at the Mediterranean Village, a residence hall located on the eastside of the main campus. It contains a library and conference hall as well as a medical centre. The residential house originally provided accommodation for athletes of the 2009 Mediterranean Games. The campus is served by Rete Ferroviaria Italiana at the Chieti–Madonna delle Piane railway station, which connects the university to the Rome–Sulmona–Pescara railway line.

=== Pescara ===
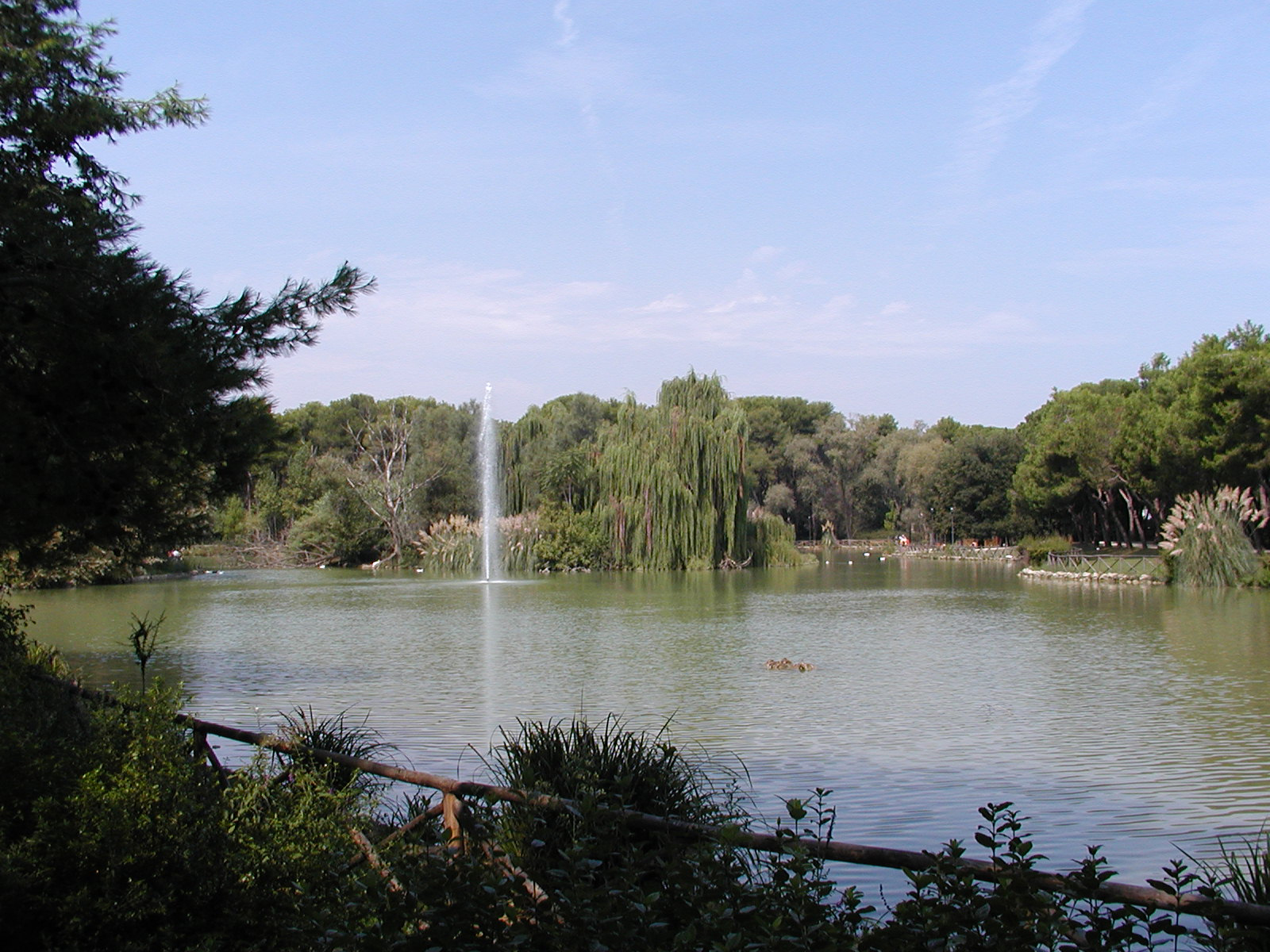
View of the Nature Reserve Pineta Dannunziana, located near the Viale Pindaro campus in Pescara

Viale Pindaro campus spans 6.29 acres (2.55 ha) in Porta Nuova, located immediately south of downtown Pescara. Situated within the urban area of the city, its academic buildings were designed according to modern architecture and through the use of environmentally friendly construction practices. Nature Reserve Pineta Dannunziana, Aurum Museum and Pescara's Citadel of Justice are located in its surrounding area. Viale Pindaro campus is the home of six departments and one school, as well as one library. It is also houses the university language centre and the local office of the Erasmus Student Network. Located at the intersection of the Citadel of Justice and Viale Pindaro, Palazzo Micara is perhaps the campus' most prominent structure. A residential hall is located in a neighbourhood half a mile northeast of the campus.

=== Other ===
D'Annunzio University provides a number of undergraduate and postgraduate detached courses in the cities of Vasto, Lanciano and Torre de' Passeri. Torrevecchia Teatina is the home of the Distance Learning Centre, structured in the research doctorate in e-learning, development and delivery. It also houses the Leonardo da Vinci University, which was created on the initiative of the D'Annunzio University Foundation.

== Organization ==
The university's formal head is the Rector, currently Sergio Caputi. The Rector is elected every four years by the board of trustees. The role of the Rector is to represent the university and to convene and chair the board of directors, the executive committee, and the academic senate. The Rector may appoint one or more Vice Rectors to which it can delegate the exercise of certain functions. D'Annunzio University provides undergraduate, graduate and post-graduate education, in addition to a range of international programs in multiple fields of study. It is divided into thirteen departments, which are primary centres where teaching and research co-exist to promote scientific activities for different educational areas. Two or more departments, grouped according to criteria of disciplinary affinity, work as connecting structures referred to as schools.

Schools and departments

- School of Medicine and Health Sciences
  - Department of Medicine and Aging Sciences
  - Department of Neurosciences, Imaging and Clinical Sciences
  - Department of Psychology, Humanistic Studies and Territorial Sciences
  - Department of Medical, Oral and Biotechnological Sciences
- School of Economics, Business, Law and Sociological Sciences
  - Department of Economics
  - Department of Law and Social Sciences
- Department of Architecture
- Department of Business Economics
- Department of Pharmacy
- Department of Earth Science and Engineering
- Department of Literature, Arts and Social Sciences
- Department of Modern Languages, Literatures and Cultures
- Department of Philosophy, Pedagogical Sciences and Quantitative Economics
- Department of Socio-Economic, Management and Statistical Studies

=== Affiliations ===
D'Annunzio University is accredited by the European University Association and a number of additional professional and educational accrediting agencies, including the European Network of Physiotherapy in Higher Education, the International Long Term Ecological Research Network, and the Emblema Network. It is a member of the Mediterranean Universities Union, the Netval Research Universities Network, AlmaLaurea, and the Interuniversity Consortium of Northeastern Italy for Automatic Computing.

== Academics ==
=== Libraries ===
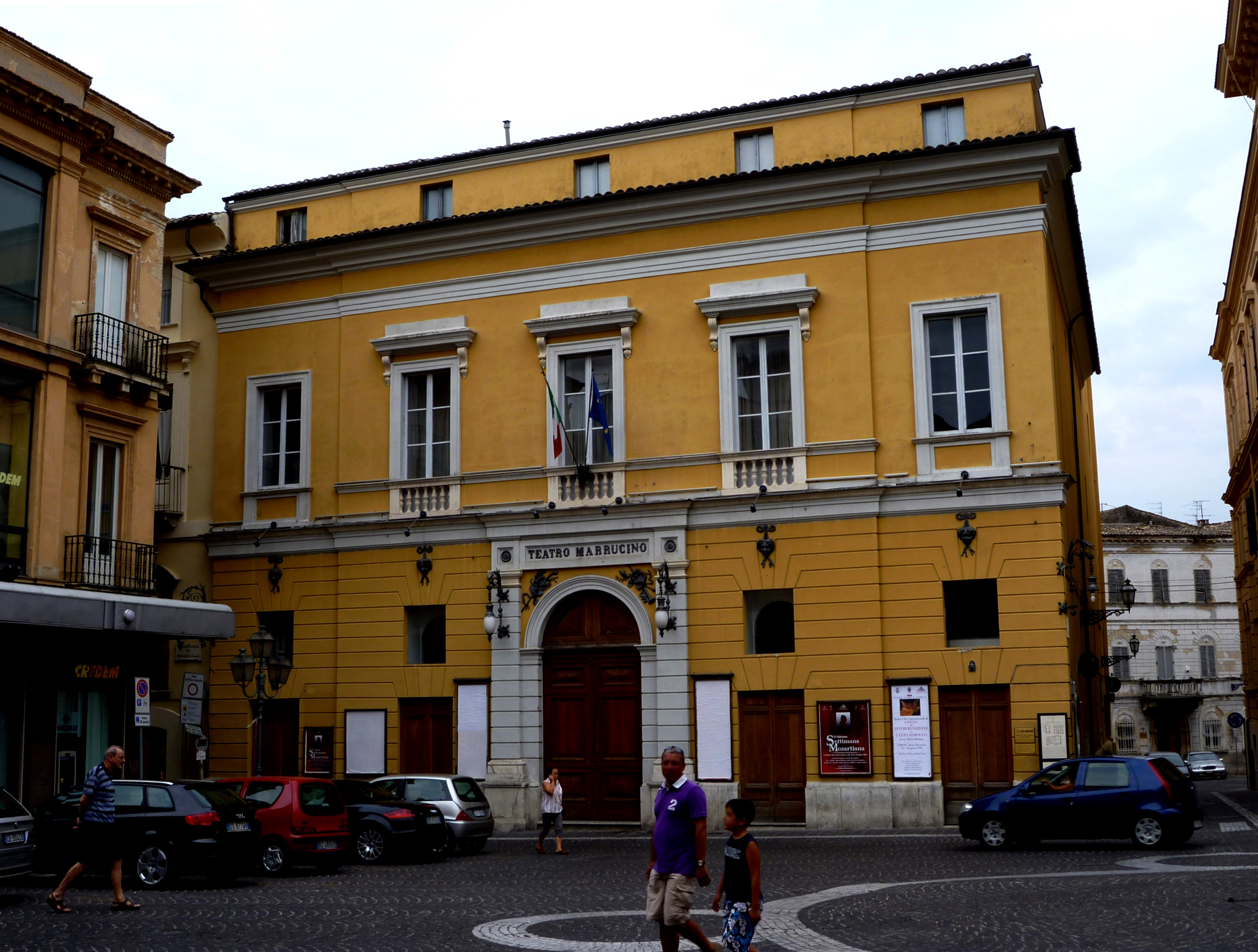
Marrucino Theatre is used to host special academic events.

The D'Annunzio University Library System consists of subject and interdisciplinary libraries as well as library funding of the sites of Chieti and Pescara. The collection covers virtually all disciplines and includes a wide array of formats – from books and journals to manuscripts and maps. Increasingly collections are digital and are accessible on the Internet via the library web page or the library catalog. The university library system also maintains subscriptions to a number of online databases which can be accessed from any student account on or off campus. There are also various specialized libraries and archives.

The Medical and Scientific Library is the main science library for D'Annunzio University. It is located on the campus in Chieti, which also houses the Ettore Paratore Library. Paratore's collections focus on Humanities, Social Sciences, and Education, and occupies three floors. The seat of Pescara is the home of a unified library centre with individual sections focusing on Architecture, Foreign Languages and Literatures, Economics and Management Sciences. It houses over 129,000 books and offers nearly 300 seats.

=== Museums ===
D'Annunzio University offers a wide range of collections which are organised into the Museum of Biomedical Sciences. It is located at Palazzo Arnaldo Mussolini in the historic centre of Chieti and was established in 1994 under the presidency of Luigi Capasso. The institution is dedicated to the knowledge and dissemination of natural sciences and history of science, focusing on biological and medical notions arising from research in archaeology, medicine and palaeontology. The permanent exhibition consists of more than 19,000 records and spans an area of over 16,000 square feet (1,500 m^{2}). The most celebrated items in the museum include vertebrate fossils from the Jurassic and Cretaceous periods.

The Museum of Biomedical Sciences is also open to the general public and provides educational programming. It includes an auditorium and a special library, as well as a number of scientific laboratories for activities of archaeological conservation and research in anthropology. It receives about 13,000 visitors every year. The institution is a member of the International Council of Museums.

=== Rankings ===
University rankings
National rankings
- CENSIS-La Repubblica (state large-sized universities): 14
- Il Sole 24 Ore (state universities): 27
- SIR World Report: 25

Global rankings
- CWTS Leiden: 572
- SIR World Report: 502
- URAP: 712

In its 2017 report, Il Sole 24 Ore ranked D'Annunzio University as the 27th-best public university in Italy. The SCImago Institutions Rankings listed it at number 25 among the top universities nationwide, and number 502 overall among the world best universities. D'Annunzio University was included in the 2018 U.S. News & World Report of the world's top 1000 universities. Its School of Medicine and Health Sciences was also rated one of the world's top 600 medical institutions. According to the 2018 ANVUR report, it has the top-ranked department of physical sciences nationwide.

In the 2017 issue of the CWTS Leiden Ranking, D'Annunzio University was ranked 572nd among world universities. The University Ranking by Academic Performance ranked it 38th among national universities and 712nd overall among academic institutions worldwide. In addition, it was included among the top 500 universities of Europe by Webometrics Ranking of World Universities and is one of the 48 Italian higher education institutions to appear in the 2017 report of the Center for World University Rankings.

=== Research ===
D'Annunzio University has long been associated with basic and advanced scientific research. In addition to state funding, it receives financial support from the D'Annunzio University Foundation, an organization which exists to manage gifts and donations to the university. The Foundation manages the university's endowment, which helps provide support for long-term university goals and for other scientific purposes. In addition to research conducted in the individual academic schools and departments, D'Annunzio University includes a number of research centres and institutes, including the Centre for Research in Aging (CeSI), the Institute of Advanced Biomedical Technologies (ITAB), a clinical research center, the Physical Medicine and Rehabilitation Centre, and the CeSI Biotech Department. The former is accredited by the United Nations Economic and Social Council. The institutes scientific works have been published on major academic journals, including PNAS and PLOS One. An operational unit of sports medicine is centred on the International Centre for Professional Training (CIAPI). D'Annunzio University has also established a botanical garden known as Giardino dei Semplici, containing a collection of herbs and woody plants related to traditional medicine which are used as an additional resource for scientific research.

== Notable people ==
D'Annunzio University's faculty has included scholars such as linguist and politician Tullio De Mauro, teleologist Vincenzo Fagiolo, writers Antonio Porta and Carlo Vecce, architect Giorgio Grassi, athlete Pietro Mennea, biologist Alberto Oliverio, musicologist Diego Carpitella, historian John Foot, linguist Pietro Trifone, psychiatrist Rita El Khayat, lawyers Flavia Lattanzi and Franco Gaetano Scoca, philosopher Sergio Cotta, economist Fabio Fortuna, and physicians Giovanni Gasbarrini and Roberto Paganelli. D'Annunzio University has produced alumni distinguished in their respective fields. Many graduates have been notable in the political arena, including deputy Maurizio Acerbo and mayor Luciano D'Alfonso. Other notable alumni include journalist Giampiero Catone, writer Giada Trebeschi, and painter Luciano de Liberato, among others.

== See also ==
- List of universities in Italy
- List of contemporary universities in Europe
- Giardino dei Semplici, Chieti
- Museum of Biomedical Sciences
- Leonardo da Vinci University
