= List of shipwrecks in August 1845 =

The list of shipwrecks in August 1845 includes ships sunk, foundered, wrecked, grounded, or otherwise lost during August 1845.

== 1 August ==
List of shipwrecks: 1 August 1845
Ship	State	Description
Cosmopolite	United Kingdom	The ship was wrecked on Fortune Island, Bahamas. Her crew were rescued. She was on a voyage from Aux Cayes, Haiti to London.
Flirt	United Kingdom	The brig capsized and sank in the River Thames at Woolwich, Kent. Her crew were rescued by the steamboat Waterman No. 11 (United Kingdom). She was later righted, refloated and towed into Shadwell, Middlesex for repairs.
Hannah	United Kingdom	The ship ran aground at Maryport, Cumberland. She was on a voyage from Quebec City, Province of Canada, British North America to Maryport.
Hope	United Kingdom	The ship was wrecked on Rodrigues. Her crew were rescued. She was on a voyage from Calcutta, India to Liverpool, Lancashire.

== 2 August ==
List of shipwrecks: 2 August 1845
Ship	State	Description
Alfred	United States	The ship ran aground off Brouwershaven, Zeeland, Netherlands. She was refloated.
Bee	United Kingdom	The ship was wrecked near Rømø, Denmark. Her crew were rescued. She was on a voyage from Hamburg to Hull, Yorkshire.
Chatham	United States	The ship sprang a leak and was abandoned in the Atlantic Ocean. Her crew were rescued by a French vessel. She was on a voyage from Liverpool, Lancashire, United Kingdom to New Orleans, Louisiana.
Dorothea Wilhelmina	Hamburg	The ship ran aground in the Weser downstream of Blankenese. She was refloated the next day.
Fortuno	Flag unknown	The ship was wrecked on the Bengaart, in the Zuyder Zee.
Gezina Catherine Brons	Danzig	The ship collided with another vessel and sank 4 nautical miles (7.4 km) south of Mandahl, Norway. Her crew were rescued. She was on a voyage from London to Danzig.

== 3 August ==
List of shipwrecks: 3 August 1845
Ship	State	Description
Meyers	Bremen	The ship ran aground in the Weser. She was on a voyage from New Orleans, Louisiana to Bremen. She was refloated and taken into Bremerhaven.
Sisters	United Kingdom	The ship was run down and sunk off Robin Hoods Bay, Yorkshire by a brig. Her crew were rescued. She was on a voyage from Sunderland, County Durham to Maldon, Essex.

== 4 August ==
List of shipwrecks: 4 August 1845
Ship	State	Description
Acadia	United Kingdom	The ship ran aground on the Duddon Sand, in the Irish Sea. She was on a voyage from Quebec City, Province of Canada to Glasson Dock, Lancashire. She was refloated on 14 August and taken into Glasson Dock in a severely damaged condition.
Bassen Merchant	(United Kingdom of Great Britain and Ireland) Burma	The schooner was wrecked near Amherst with the loss of two lives.
Cataraqui	United Kingdom	Cataraqui. The barque was wrecked in the Bass Strait with the loss of 399 of the 408 people on board. She was on a voyage from Liverpool, Lancashire to Port Phillip, New South Wales.
Eliza and Mary	United Kingdom	The ship was driven ashore and damaged at Bexhill-on-Sea, Sussex. She was refloated and taken into Folkestone, Kent.
Johanna	Belgium	The ship was abandoned in the North Sea off the coast of Norfolk, United Kingdom.
Louise	United Kingdom	The ship sprang a leak in the Kattegat. She was towed into Gothenburg in a waterlogged condition by HSwMS Najaden (Swedish Navy). Louise was on a voyage from Newport, Monmouthshire to Stettin.
Oscar	Prussia	The ship was driven ashore at Memel. She was later refloated and taken into Memel.
Tarugo	Hamburg	The ship ran aground on the Klein Vogelsand, in the North Sea. She was on a voyage from Bahia, Brazil to Hamburg. She was refloated.
Thomas and Hannah	United Kingdom	The brig was driven ashore on "Green Island", near Algeciras, Spain.

== 5 August ==
List of shipwrecks: 5 August 1845
Ship	State	Description
Elizabeth	Sweden	The schooner was driven ashore and wrecked on the Gedsloss Hamoaze.
Superb	United Kingdom	The ship was wrecked near Blanc-Salon, Province of Canada, British North America.

== 6 August ==
List of shipwrecks: 6 August 1845
Ship	State	Description
Amy Ann	United Kingdom	The ship ran aground at Alexandria, Egypt. She was on a voyage from Alexandria to London. She was refloated the next day and resumed her voyage.
Drunmore	United Kingdom	The ship caught fire in the South Atlantic. Her crew were rescued by Crishna (Flag unknown). Drunmore was on a voyage from Leith, Lothian to Aden.
Jonathan Fell	United Kingdom	The ship struck a sunken rock off the "Great Castillos", Argentina and was beached. HMS Comus (Royal Navy) was sent to her assistance, but she had become a wreck by 19 August.
Micmac	(United Kingdom of Great Britain and Ireland) British North America	The ship ran aground in the River Dee. She was on a voyage from Quebec City, Province of Canada to Flint. She was refloated.
Sovereign	United Kingdom	The ship was driven ashore at Fraserburgh, Aberdeenshire. She was on a voyage from Banff, Aberdeenshire to London. She was refloated and resumed her voyage.
Thomas and Harriet	United Kingdom	The brig was driven ashore on Green Island, Spain. She was refloated and resumed her voyage.

== 7 August ==
List of shipwrecks: 7 August 1845
Ship	State	Description
Arveprinds Karl or Kron Prins Karl	Denmark	The ship was wrecked near Narva, Russia. Her crew were rescued.
London	United Kingdom	The ship collided with Sibilla (United Kingdom) and foundered in the English Channel off Dungeness, Kent. Her crew were rescued. She was on a voyage from Whitby, Yorkshire to Portsmouth, Hampshire.
Trafalgar	United Kingdom	The ship ran aground at Maryport, Cumberland. She was on a voyage from Quebec City, Province of Canada, British North America to Maryport. She was refloated.
Wetampka	United States	The brig was driven ashore at the mouth of the Guariaro. She was on a voyage from Palermo, Sicily to New York. She was refloated the next day and taken into Gibraltar for repairs.

== 8 August ==
List of shipwrecks: 8 August 1845
Ship	State	Description
Amy Ann	United Kingdom	The ship ran aground at Alexandria, Egypt. She was on a voyage from Alexandria to London. She was refloated and resumed her voyage.
Ann Catharina	Denmark	The ship was driven ashore near Nyborg. She was refloated.
Elizabeth	Sweden	The brig was driven ashore at Gibraltar. She was on a voyage from Torrevecchia Teatina, Kingdom of the Two Sicilies to Gothenburg. She was refloated and resumed her voyage.
Heed	United Kingdom	The ship was in collision with Elizabeth and Ann (United Kingdom) and foundered in the English Channel. Her crew were rescued. She was on a voyage from Neath, Glamorgan to a Cornish port.
Latona	United States	The schooner capsized in a squall. Her crew were rescued by Sapphire (United Kingdom). She was on a voyage from Boston, Massachusetts to Haiti.
Planet	United Kingdom	The ship was wrecked on the Sandhammer Reef, in the Baltic Sea. Her crew were rescued.

== 9 August ==
List of shipwrecks: 9 August 1845
Ship	State	Description
Active	United Kingdom	The ship sprang a leak and was beached in Plettenberg Bay. Her crew were rescued.
Byzantium	United Kingdom	The schooner was driven ashore at Olhão, Portugal. She was on a voyage from Liverpool, Lancashire to Symi, Greece. She was refloated and taken into Olhão.
Nyord	Hamburg	The ship was driven ashore and damaged on Düne, Heligoland. She was on a voyage from Wick, Caithness to Hamburg. She was refloated on 12 August.
Mermaid	United Kingdom	The schooner collided with the brig New England (United States) and was beached on Georges Island, Massachusetts, United States. She was on a voyage from Boston, Massachusetts to Yarmouth, Nova Scotia, British North America.
Prospect	United Kingdom	The ship ran aground on the Gunfleet Sand, in the North Sea off the coast of Essex. She was refloated and proceeded for the River Thames.
Rose	United Kingdom	The ship was lost at the mouth of the Gambia River.

== 10 August ==
List of shipwrecks: 10 August 1845
Ship	State	Description
Cahawba	United States	The ship ran aground in the Gut of Canso She was on a voyage from Pictou, Nova Scotia, British North America to the Fall River, Massachusetts.
Dawsons	United Kingdom	The ship ran aground on the Kentish Knock. She was on a voyage from Miramichi, New Brunswick, British North America to Hull, Yorkshire. She was refloated and put into Great Yarmouth, Norfolk in a leaky condition the next day.
Lark	United Kingdom	The ship collided with Fairy (United Kingdom) and foundered in the North Sea with the loss of a life.
Rankin	United Kingdom	The ship was driven ashore near Black Rock.
Sir John Beresford	United Kingdom	The ship ran aground on the Burbo Bank, in Liverpool Bay. She was on a voyage from Hamburg to Liverpool, Lancashire. She was refloated and beached near the Rock Lighthouse. Subsequently refloated and taken into Liverpool.
Ullswater	United Kingdom	The ship ran aground and was wrecked on the West Hoyle Bank, in Liverpool Bay. Her crew were rescued by the Hoylake Lifeboat and the Point of Ayr Lifeboat. She was on a voyage from Mazatlan, Cuba to Liverpool.
Vernon	United Kingdom	The ship was driven ashore at Redcar, Yorkshire. She was on a voyage from Arkhangelsk, Russia to London.

== 11 August ==
List of shipwrecks: 11 August 1845
Ship	State	Description
Carl Lisette	Wismar	The ship sprang a leak and sank in the North Sea. Her crew were rescued by Medborgen Sorenson (Flag unknown). She was on a voyage from Wismar to Jersey, Channel Islands.
John Henry	(United Kingdom of Great Britain and Ireland) British North America	The ship was wrecked on the Thrumcar Reef. Her crew were rescued.
Johns	United Kingdom	The ship was driven ashore on the west coast of Uist. She was on a voyage from Quebec City, Province of Canada, British North America to Sunderland, County Durham. She was refloated on 15 August and taken into Lochmaddy.
John White	United Kingdom	The ship ran aground on a rock off North Uist Outer Hebrides and was damaged. She was on a voyage from Quebec City, Province of Canada, British North America to "Newborough". She was refloated the next day and taken into Lochmaddy.
Susan	United Kingdom	The ship ran aground on the Jack-in-the-Basket Sandbank, off the coast of the Isle of Wight.

== 12 August ==
List of shipwrecks: 12 August 1845
Ship	State	Description
Ann Harley	United States	The ship was driven ashore at New York. She was on a voyage from New York to Glasgow, Renfrewshire, United Kingdom. She was refloated and resumed her voyage.
Falcon	United Kingdom	The ship ran aground on the Lapsand. She was on a voyage from Stockton-on-Tees, County Durham to Stettin. She was refloated and resumed her voyage.
Ida Mathilda	Norway	The ship was driven ashore and wrecked at Mumby, Lincolnshire, United Kingdom. Her crew were rescued. She was on a voyage from Trondheim to Havre de Grâce, Seine-Inférieure, France.

== 13 August ==
List of shipwrecks: 13 August 1845
Ship	State	Description
Admiral Nelson	United Kingdom	The ship was driven ashore at St. Steffano Point, Ottoman Empire.
Ann Harley	United Kingdom	The barque was driven ashore at New York, United States. She was on a voyage from New York to Glasgow, Renfrewshire. She was later refloated and resumed her voyage.
Marcombie	United Kingdom	The ship was wrecked west of the Middleton Point Lighthouse, India.
Patience	United Kingdom	The ship ran aground and capsized at Hull, Yorkshire. She was on a voyage from Saint Petersburg, Russia to Hull. She was later righted and taken into Hull.
Sophia	Russia	The full-rigged ship ran aground at Hull.
William	United Kingdom	The ship sprang a leak in the North Sea off the Dudgeon Lightship ( Trinity House). She foundered the next day with the loss of a crew member. She was on a voyage from Seaton, County Durham to London.

== 14 August ==
List of shipwrecks: 14 August 1845
Ship	State	Description
Barco	Spain	The ship was driven ashore on the south coast of the Isle of Wight, United Kingdom. She was on a voyage from Sunderland, County Durham, United Kingdom to Barcelona. She was refloated and taken into Cowes, Isle of Wight.
Commodore	United Kingdom	The ship ran aground on the Burbo Bank, in Liverpool Bay. She was on a voyage from Liverpool, Lancashire to Rio de Janeiro, Brazil. She was refloated the next day and put back to Liverpool.
Euphrosyne	United Kingdom	The ship ran aground in the River Lune. She was on a voyage from Quebec City, Province of Canada, British North America to Lancaster, Lancashire.
Goede Verwachting	Netherlands	The ship departed from Amsterdam, North Holland for Hamburg. No further trace, presumed foundered with the loss of all hands.
Imogen	United Kingdom	The ship was driven ashore at Helsingør, Denmark. She was on a voyage from Liverpool, Lancashire to Saint Petersburg, Russia. She was refloated the next day and resumed her voyage.
Ready Rhino	United Kingdom	The ship was driven ashore at Saint John, New Brunswick, British North America. She was on a voyage from London to Saint John. She was refloated.

== 15 August ==
List of shipwrecks: 15 August 1845
Ship	State	Description
Fanny	United Kingdom	The ship was driven ashore andsank at Bideford, Devon. She was refloated on 18 August and taken into Bideford in a severely damaged condition.
Favourite	United Kingdom	The ship ran aground and was severely damaged at Fraserburgh, Aberdeenshire. She was on a voyage from Wick, Caithness to Fraserburgh. She was refloated and taken into Fraserburg.
Harding Castle	United Kingdom	The ship was driven ashore at Maryport, Cumberland. She was refloated and proceeded on her voyage.
Liberty	United Kingdom	The ship was driven ashore at Maryport. She was refloated and proceeded on her voyage.
Sarah Henrietta	(United Kingdom of Great Britain and Ireland) British North America	The ship was wrecked at Cape Negro, Nova Scotia. She was on a voyage from Bermuda to Saint Andrews, New Brunswick.
Stewart	United Kingdom	The ship was driven ashore at Maryport. She was refloated and taken into Maryport for repairs.
William and Mary	United Kingdom	The ship was driven ashore at Maryport. She was refloated and proeeded on her voyage.

== 16 August ==
List of shipwrecks: 16 August 1845
Ship	State	Description
Jonathan	United Kingdom	The ship ran aground of the Great Castillos and was consequently beached on the coast of Argentina. She was on a voyage from Liverpool, Lancashire to Buenos Aires, Argentina. The vessel and those on board were plundered by the local inhabitants; HMS Comus (Royal Navy) was sent to her assistance.
Marie	Netherlands	The ship ran aground and was wrecked on the Herd Sand, in the North Sea off the coast of County Durham, United Kingdom. Her crew were rescued. She was on a voyage from Schiedam, South Holland to South Shields, County Durham.
Schyryd	Grand Duchy of Tuscany	The ship ran aground on the Battery Reef, off the coast of Devon, United Kingdom. She was on a voyage from Newcastle upon Tyne, Northumberland, United Kingdom to Livorno. She was refloated.

== 17 August ==
List of shipwrecks: 17 August 1845
Ship	State	Description
Berlin	United Kingdom	The ship ran aground at New Orleans, Louisiana, United States. She was on a voyage from New Orleans to Liverpool, Lancashire.
Providence	United Kingdom	The ship ran aground at Ramsgate, Kent. She was on a voyage from Truro, Cornwall to London. She was refloated with assistance from HMS Porcupine (Royal Navy) and taken into Ramsgate.

== 18 August ==
List of shipwrecks: 18 August 1845
Ship	State	Description
John Burrell or John Russell	United Kingdom	The brig was driven ashore at Cape Magnusholm, Russia. She was refloated on 20 August and taken into Bolderāja, Russia.
Linnet	United Kingdom	The ship was sighted off Whitley, Northumberland. No further trace, presumed foundered with the loss of all hands.
Nelly Godquin	France	The schooner ran aground in the Scheldt and was severely damaged. She was on a voyage from Newcastle upon Tyne, Northumberland, United Kingdom to Antwerp, Belgium. She was refloated and taken into Antwerp.
Prince Albert Edward	United Kingdom	The schooner was driven ashore and severely damaged at South Shields, County Durham. She was on a voyage from Faversham, Kent to South Shields. She was refloated and taken into South Shields.

== 19 August ==
List of shipwrecks: 19 August 1845
Ship	State	Description
Avon	United Kingdom	The ship departed from Seaham, County Durham for Wisbech, Cambridgeshire. No further trace, presumed foundered with the loss of all hands.
Henry	United Kingdom	The ship was driven ashore and wrecked at Filey, Yorkshire.
Hebburn	United Kingdom	The schooner was driven ashore at Havre de Grâce, Seine-Inférieure, France. Her crew were rescued.
Lord Maidstone	United Kingdom	The ship ran aground on the Robbine Reef. She was on a voyage from Liverpool, Lancashire to New York. She was refloated the next day and taken into New York.
Louisa	United Kingdom	The ship capsized in the North Sea 18 nautical miles (33 km) off Whitby, Yorkshire. She was righted and was driven out to 135 nmi (250 km) offshore. She was on a voyage from Newhaven, Sussex to Sunderland, County Durham. Louisa was taken intow by the brig Thomas Kennion and arrived at Hartlepool, County Durham on 27 August.
Omnibus	United Kingdom	The sloop was driven ashore at "Waldam", 9 nautical miles (17 km) from Calais, France. She was refloated on 3 September and taken into Calais.
Packet	United Kingdom	The schooner was dismasted in the Atlantic Ocean in a hurricane. Four of her crew were taken off by the barque Rapid (United Kingdom) on 22 August leaving her mate on board. He was taken off by the brig Sabina (Spain) on 3 September. Packet was on a voyage from Port-au-Prince, Haiti to an English port.
Rachel	United Kingdom	The sloop was wrecked near Hilbre Island, Cheshire. Her crew were rescued.
Riscatto	Kingdom of Sardinia	The ship was driven ashore near Faro, Portugal. She was on a voyage from Odesa to Antwerp, Belgium. She was refloated and resumed her voyage.
Speculation	United Kingdom	The ship sank at Whitby, Yorkshire.
Thomas and Margaret	United Kingdom	The ship ran aground at Portsmouth, Hampshire. She was on a voyage from Portsmouth to Sunderland, County Durham. She was refloated and resumed her voyage.
Venskabet	Norway	The schooner foundered off "Oxebye". Her crew were rescued.
Wave	United Kingdom	The ship capsized and sank off Wellington, New Zealand.
Wellington	United Kingdom	The ship was driven ashore and damaged at Maryport, Cumberland. She was refloated and put back to Maryport for repairs.

== 20 August ==
List of shipwrecks: 20 August 1845
Ship	State	Description
Aquatic	United Kingdom	The schooner ran aground and sank south west of Heligoland. All on board were rescued. She was on a voyage from Hamburg to Hull, Yorkshire.
Arno	United Kingdom	The brig was abandoned in the North Sea 38 nautical miles (70 km) west of the Dudgeon Lightship ( Trinity House). Her crew were rescued by Jane Jackson (United Kingdom).
Caroline	United Kingdom	The ship foundered in the North Sea off Flamborough Head, Yorkshire. Her crew were rescued. She was on a voyage from Blyth, Northumberland to Cherbourg, Seine-Inférieure, France.
Clara	United Kingdom	The ship foundered in the North Sea off the Lemon Lightship ( Trinity House) with the loss of all hands.
Countess of Eglington	United Kingdom	The ship was driven ashore at the mouth of the Monkey River.
Durham	United Kingdom	The ship foundered in the North Sea 40 nautical miles (74 km) north west of Flamborough Head. Her eight crew were rescued.
Experiment	United Kingdom	The ship sprang a leak and sank in the Bristol Channel 4 nautical miles (7.4 km) west of Lundy Island, Devon. Her crew were rescued. She was on a voyage from Fowey, Cornwall to Newport, Monmouthshire.
Felix	United Kingdom	The brig was abandoned in the North Sea off Flamborough Head. Her crew were rescued by Venus (United Kingdom). She was on a voyage from Warkworth, Northumberland to London.
Five Sodskende	Norway	The brig was driven ashore in Lannion Bay. She was on a voyage from Mandahl to Morlaix, Finistère, France.
Friendship	United Kingdom	The ship was driven ashore, capsized and sank at Portishead, Somerset. Her crew were rescued. She was on a voyage from Hull to Bristol, Gloucestershire.
Gute Christine or Gute Hoffnung	Norway	The brig was in collision with Mary Ann Melivlle (United Kingdom) and was severely damaged. She was on a voyage from "Wyborg" to Bordeaux, Gironde, France. she put into Helsingør, Denmark in a waterlogged condition.
Halcyon	United Kingdom	The ship ran aground on Scroby Sands, Norfolk. She was refloated.
Irwell	United Kingdom	The ship foundered in the North Sea 20 nautical miles (37 km) off the mouth of the Humber. Her five crew were rescued.
Leith	United Kingdom	The schooner foundered in the North Sea off Flamborough Head. Her crew were rescued by the schooner Creole (France).
Linskolms	United Kingdom	The sloop was driven ashore and wrecked at Leure Cove, near Havre de Grâce, Seine-Inférieure, France. Her crew were rescued. She was on a voyage from Newcastle upon Tyne, Northumberland to Rouen, Seine-Inférieure.
Minerva	United Kingdom	The ship was driven ashore at Wyk auf Föhr, Duchy of Holstein. She was on a voyage from Hamburg to Newcastle upon Tyne. She was consequently condemned.
New Eagle	United Kingdom	The ship foundered in the North Sea off the Dudgeon Lightship ( Trinity House). Her fourteen crew were rescued by Coralie (France).
Red Rover	United Kingdom	The fishing vessel was driven ashore and wrecked at Dunbar, Lothian with the loss of five of her six crew and five people who went to their rescue.
Regina	United Kingdom	The sloop was wrecked at Whaligoe, Caithness. Her crew were rescued.
Sovereign	United Kingdom	The ship foundered in the North Sea 20 nautical miles (37 km) east south east of the Lemon Lightship ( Trinity House). Her crew were rescued. She was on a voyage from Lowestoft, Suffolk to Goole, Yorkshire.
William	United Kingdom	The ship foundered 25 nautical miles (46 km) off Smith's Knowl, in the North Sea off the coast of Norfolk with the loss of one of her seven crew.

== 20 August ==
List of shipwrecks: 20 August 1845
Ship	State	Description
Margaret	United Kingdom	The ship ran aground on the Diamond Reef, off Antigua. She was later refloated.

== 21 August ==
List of shipwrecks: 21 August 1845
Ship	State	Description
Barbara	United Kingdom	The ship was driven ashore and wrecked at Westerhever, Duchy of Holstein. Her seven crew survived. She was on a voyage from Hamburg to Hartlepool, County Durham.
Bell and Anna	United Kingdom	The ship collided with Ocean (United Kingdom) and sank off Bawdsey, Suffolk. Her crew were rescued.
Diana	Grand Duchy of Oldenburg	The ship was abandoned in the North Sea off Borkum, Kingdom of Hanover. Her crew were rescued by the kuff Lina (United Kingdom. Diana was on a voyage from Antwerp, Belgium to Saint Petersburg, Russia.
Elizabeth	United Kingdom	The brig foundered in the North Sea 60 nautical miles (110 km) off Hartlepool, County Durham with the loss of all but one of her crew. The survivor was rescued by the fishing smack Vriendschap (Netherlands). Elizabeth was on a voyage from South Shields, County Durham to Saint Petersburg.
Hercules	Grand Duchy of Mecklenburg-Schwerin	The Ribnitz brig was driven ashore on Læsø, Denmark. Her crew were rescued by the brig Forth (United Kingdom). She was on a voyage from Stettin to London.
Imogene	United Kingdom	The ship was wrecked on Nickman's Ground, in the Baltic Sea with the loss of eight of her fifteen crew. Survivors were rescued by Integrity (United Kingdom). Imogene was on a voyage from Liverpool, Lancashire to Saint Petersburg.
Jane	United Kingdom	The ship was wrecked on Anholt, Denmark. Her crew were rescued. She was on a voyage from Stockholm, Sweden to Sligo.
Jennet	United Kingdom	The brig ran aground on the South Gar, off the mouth of the River Tees. She was refloated and taken into Middlesbrough, County Durham.
Jonge Elsabe	Hamburg	The ship was driven ashore near Tønning, Duchy of Holstein. She was on a voyage from Flensburg, Duchy of Holstein to Hamburg.
Mary Hurst	United Kingdom	The ship was driven ashore and wrecked at St. Bees Head, Cumberland. Her crew were rescued. She was on a voyage from Dublin to Whitehaven, Cumberland.
Mayflower	United Kingdom	The ship was wrecked on the Burbo Bank, in Liverpool Bay. Her crew were rescued. She was on a voyage from London to Liverpool, Lancashire.
Nathaniel	United Kingdom	The ship was abandoned in the North Sea 110 nautical miles (200 km) off Flamborough Head, Yorkshire. Her crew were rescued.
Pandora	United Kingdom	The ship capsized and sank at Plymouth, Devon. She was refloated the next day.
Samuel and Sarah	United Kingdom	The ship foundered in the North Sea off the Brown Bank. Her seven crew were rescued.
Sarah	United States	The ship was wrecked at Anjer, Netherlands East Indies.
Sarah Henrietta	(United Kingdom of Great Britain and Ireland) British North America	The ship was wrecked on Cape Negro, Nova Scotia. She was on a voyage from Saint Andrew, New Brunswick to Bermuda.
Theseus	United Kingdom	The ship ran aground on the Morups Tage, off Falkenberg, Sweden. She was refloated but consequently foundered 15 nautical miles (28 km) off shore with the loss of all but two of her crew. She was on a voyage from Saint Petersburg to London.
Thomas and Ann	United Kingdom	The ship was driven ashore near Paull, Yorkshire. She was on a voyage from Spalding, Lincolnshire to Hull, Yorkshire. She was refloated and taken into Hull.
Vrouw Elsina	Kingdom of Hanover	The kuff was driven ashore on Sylt in a capsized condition. She was on a voyage from Hamburg to Amsterdam, North Holland, Netherlands.

== 22 August ==
List of shipwrecks: 22 August 1845
Ship	State	Description
Anna	Kingdom of Hanover	The ship was driven ashore near Sønderho, Denmark. Her crew were rescued.
Elizabeth	Russia	The brig was holed by an anchor and sank in the Dwina. She was on a voyage from Torrevecchia Teatina, Kingdom of the Two Sicilies to Pernau, Livonia, Russian Empire and Saint Petersburg.
Hermann de Buhr	Kingdom of Hanover	The kuff was driven ashore on Sylt. Her crew were rescued. She was on a voyage from Hamburg to London, United Kingdom.
Margaret	United Kingdom	The ship was wrecked at Lossiemouth, Lothian. Her crew were rescued.
Neerland	Duchy of Holstein	The ship was driven ashore on Sylt. Her crew were rescued.
Packet	United Kingdom	The ship was abandoned in the Atlantic Ocean by all but her mate. The rest of her crew were taken off by an unnamed vessel. Packet was on a voyage from Saint Domingo to Falmouth, Cornwall.
Providentia	Hamburg	The ship was driven ashore at Ringkøbing, Denmark with the loss of one life. She was on a voyage from Hamburg to Newcastle upon Tyne, Northumberland.
Rapid	United Kingdom	The brig ran aground on the Keonpsand, in the North Sea off Amrum, Duchy of Holstein with the loss of four of her eight crew. She became a wreck on 18 September.

== 23 August ==
List of shipwrecks: 23 August 1845
Ship	State	Description
Ann Bell	United Kingdom	The brig collided with the barque Eden (United Kingdom) and sank at Harwich, Essex. Her crew were rescued.
Ark	United Kingdom	The ship was driven ashore at Spurn Point, East Riding of Yorkshire. She was on a voyage from Newcastle upon Tyne, Northumberland to Great Yarmouth, Norfolk.
Betsey	United Kingdom	The ship was driven ashore at Spurn Point.
Betsey	United Kingdom	The ship was wrecked on "Blaanam". Her crew were rescued. She was on a voyage from Glückstadt, Duchy of Schleswig to Sunderland, County Durham.
Centenary	United Kingdom	The brig was abandoned in the North Sea off the Dudgeon Lightship ( Trinity House). Her crew were rescued by Kingston-by-Sea (United Kingdom). Centenary was on a voyage from Sunderland, County Durham to London.
Fives	United Kingdom	The brig was wrecked on the Horn Reef, in the North Sea with the loss of five of her crew. She was on a voyage from Newcastle upon Tyne to Hamburg.
Francis	United Kingdom	The ship was driven ashore at Spurn Point. She was on a voyage from Ipswich, Suffolk to Newcastle upon Tyne, Northumberland.
Hebe	United Kingdom	The ship was driven ashore near "Kenken", Ottoman Empire. She was on a voyage from Liverpool, Lancashire to Constantinople, Ottoman Empire. She was refloated on 8 September and resumed her voyage.
Helena	Hamburg	The ship was wrecked on the coast of Jutland, Denmark with the loss of a crew member. She was on a voyage from Hamburg to Saint Petersburg, Russia.
Imogene	United Kingdom	The ship ran aground on Nickman's Ground, in the Baltic Sea. She became a wreck the next day with the loss of eight of her fifteen crew. Survivors were rescued by Integrity (United Kingdom). She was on a voyage from Liverpool to Saint Petersburg, Russia.
Lykkens Prove	Denmark	The ship was wrecked near Hjerting. She was on a voyage from Ringkøbing to Altona.
Moetina	Flag unknown	The ship was wrecked on Norderney, Prussia. She was on a voyage from "Welner" to London.
Nautilus	United Kingdom	The ship was driven ashore at Spurn Point.
Phoenix	United Kingdom	The ship was wrecked at "Hennegaad". Her crew were rescued. She was on a voyage from Aberdeen to Hamburg.
Three Brothers	United Kingdom	The ship was driven ashore at Spurn Point. She was on a voyage from Goole, Yorkshire to Sunderland. She was refloated and put into Hull.
Winskkalut	Bremen	The ship was wrecked on "Blaanam". Her crew were rescued. She was on a voyage from Bremen to Stavanger, Norway.

== 24 August ==
List of shipwrecks: August 1845
Ship	State	Description
Comet	United Kingdom	The ship was driven ashore and wrecked near Büsum, Duchy of Schleswig. Her crew were rescued. She was on a voyage from London to Hamburg.
Cybele	United Kingdom	The barque was abandoned in the North Sea off the Dudgeon Lightship ( Trinity House). Her crew were rescued by Elizabeth and Sarah (United Kingdom). Cybele was on a voyage from Newcastle upon Tyne, Northumberland to London.
Jim	United Kingdom	The schooner capsized at New Ross, County Wexford and was severely damaged.
Statira	United Kingdom	The ship was driven ashore at Beachy Head, Sussex. She was on a voyage from Newcastle upon Tyne to Teignmouth, Devon.

== 25 August ==
List of shipwrecks: 24 August 1845
Ship	State	Description
Jonge Johannes	Stettin	The ship was driven ashore on the Minser Alde Oog, Kingdom of Hanover. She was on a voyage from Antwerp, Belgium to Stettin.
No. 2	France	The lugger was driven ashore at Whitby, Yorkshire, United Kingdom. She was refloated and resumed her voyage.
Oak	United Kingdom	The brig drifted onto rocks at Lybster, Caithness; the crew was rescued.

== 26 August ==
List of shipwrecks: 26 August 1845
Ship	State	Description
Roe	United Kingdom	The schooner was driven ashore at Rattray Head, Aberdeenshire. She was on a voyage from Liverpool, Lancashire to Perth.
Seaflower	United States	The schooner was wrecked at Arichat, Nova Scotia, British North America. Her crew were rescued.

== 27 August ==
List of shipwrecks: September 1845
Ship	State	Description
Acadian	United Kingdom	The ship ran aground at Sharpness, Gloucestershire.
Annegina	Netherlands	The ship sank on the Kaap Buoy. Her crew were rescued. She was on a voyage from Delfzijl, South Holland to a Norwegian port.
Eli Chapman	United Kingdom	The ship was driven ashore at Liverpool, Lancashire.
Greave	United Kingdom	The ship was driven ashore south west of Kronstadt, Russia. She was on a voyage from Leith, Lothian to Kronstadt. She was later refloated.
Lark	United Kingdom	The ship was driven ashore at St. Bees Head, Cumberland. She was on a voyage from Dublin to Whitehaven, Cumberland. She was refloated on 29 August and taken into Whitehaven.
Wilhelm	Flag unknown	The ship was driven ashore and wrecked west of Ostend, West Flanders, Belgium. She was on a voyage from Gothenburg, Sweden to Ostend.

== 28 August ==
List of shipwrecks: 28 August 1845
Ship	State	Description
Familien Fraul	Norway	The ship ran aground on the Kentish Knock. She was on a voyage from Cádiz, Spain to Ålesund. She was refloated and put into Ramsgate, Kent, United Kingdom in a leaky condition.
Industry	United Kingdom	The ship ran aground off Skagen, Denmark. She was on a voyage from Alloa, Clackmannanshire to Saint Petersburg, Russia. She was refloated and resumed her voyage.
Margaret	United Kingdom	The barque ran aground on the Diamond Reef and was damaged. She was on a voyage from London to Belize City, British Honduras. She was refloated and put into Antigua.
Mary Stuart	United Kingdom	The ship ran aground near Missolonghi, Greece. She was on a voyage from Patras, Greece to Cardiff, Glamorgan.
Osprey	United Kingdom	The ship was wrecked on Anticosti Island, Nova Scotia. British North America. Her crew were rescued.
Vouwarts	Kingdom of Prussia	The ship ran aground off Læsø, Denmark. She was on a voyage from St Ubes, Portugal to Königsberg. She was refloated and resumed her voyage.

== 29 August ==
List of shipwrecks: 29 August 1845
Ship	State	Description
Christine Mathilde	Hamburg	The ship was wrecked off Scharhörn. Her crew were rescued. She was on a voyage from Hamburg to Newcastle upon Tyne, Northumberland, United Kingdom.
Eclipse	United Kingdom	The ship was driven ashore at Canisbay, Caithness. She was on a voyage from Montreal, Province of Canada, British North America to Dundee, Forfarshire. She was refloated.
Mars	United Kingdom	The ship struck the Sugar-loaf Rock, off the east coast of "Bintang" and sank. All on board were rescued. She was on a voyage from Singapore to Liverpool, Lancashire.
Peak	United Kingdom	The ship was driven ashore and severely damaged at the Peak Alum Works, Ravenscar, Yorkshire. She was later refloated and taken into Whitby.

== 30 August ==
List of shipwrecks: 30 August 1845
Ship	State	Description
Martha	(United Kingdom of Great Britain and Ireland) New South Wales	The brig was wrecked in Mossul Bay. All on board were rescued. She was on a voyage from Sydney to Cape Town, Cape Colony.

== 31 August ==
List of shipwrecks: 31 August 1845
Ship	State	Description
Abus	United Kingdom	The ship ran aground on "Stronskar" and capsized. She was on a voyage from Saint Petersburg, Russia to Hull, Yorkshire.
Margaret	United Kingdom	The ship was driven ashore at Krasnaya Gorka, Russia. She was on a voyage from Saint Petersburg to the Clyde.
Tre Soner	Sweden	The ship ran aground on a reef off Hablingbo and was damaged. She was refloated.

== Unknown date ==
List of shipwrecks: Unknown date in August 1845
Ship	State	Description
Albion	United Kingdom	The galiot was abandoned in the North Sea before 22 August. She was taken into Sylt, Duchy of Schleswig as a derelict on that day. She was on a voyage from Hamburg to Hull, Yorkshire.
Ambassador	United Kingdom	The ship was destroyed by an explosion at Benin, Kingdom of Dahomey before 25 August with the loss of three of her crew.
Bella Gascongeda	Flag unknown	The ship ran aground and was severely damaged at Woosung, China before 9 August.
Berentia	Belgium	The tjalk ran aground before 29 August. She put into Büsum, Duchy of Schleswig in a leaky condition.
Douze Julliet	United Kingdom	The ship departed from Havre de Grâce in late August for Antwerp. No further trace, presumed foundered with the loss of all hands.
Elizabeth	United Kingdom	The brig struck a sunken rock before 30 August and was damaged. She was on a voyage from Penang, Straits Settlements to Hong Kong.
Empress	United States	The ship was wrecked on the Jedore Ledges before 4 August. She was on a voyage from Portsmouth, New Hampshire to Pictou, Nova Scotia, British North America.
Gasses or Jasses	Belgium	The ship caught fire whilst on a voyage from Seville, Spain to Antwerp. She put into Corcubión, Spain, where she was scuttled.
Graf Gerhard	Rostock	The ship departed from Tønning, Duchy of Holstein for an English port. No further trace, presumed foundered with the loss of all hands.
Hope	(United Kingdom of Great Britain and Ireland) Van Diemen's Land	The ship was driven ashore at Port Sorrell before 13 August.
Indemnity	(United Kingdom of Great Britain and Ireland) British North America	The ship was wrecked in the Magdalen Islands, Nova Scotia before 7 August with the loss of a crew member.
John Healte	(United Kingdom of Great Britain and Ireland) British North America	The ship was abandoned off Bermuda before 5 August.
Lancer	United Kingdom	The brig was abandoned in the Atlantic Ocean before 2 August. Six of her crew were rescued by Prince Regent (United Kingdom).
Liverpool	United Kingdom	The brig was abandoned in the North Sea before 22 August. She was taken into Sylt on that day as a derelict. She was on a voyage from Hamburg to Newcastle upon Tyne, Northumberland.
Louise	France	The ship was wrecked in the Maldives before 20 August. Her crew were rescued.
Mary	(United Kingdom of Great Britain and Ireland) British North America	The ship was abandoned in the Atlantic Ocean before 18 August. She was discovered on that day by Albion (United Kingdom) and was subsequently taken into Saint John's, Newfoundland.
Marys	United Kingdom	The sloop was driven ashore at "Leuve", France. She was refloated on 5 September and taken into Havre de Grâce, Seine-Inférieure.
Patriot	Flag unknown	The ship foundered in the North Sea off the coast of Denmark on or before 5 August.
Quatre Soeurs	Norway	The ship was driven ashore on "Meulien" and was abandoned by her crew. She was on a voyage from Arendal to Morlaix, Finistère, France. She was refloated on 21 August and towed into "Yandel".
Quebec	(United Kingdom of Great Britain and Ireland) British North America	The steamship sank at Saint-Anne-de-Beaupré, Province of Canada. She was on a voyage from Quebec City to Montreal was.
Rankin	United Kingdom	The ship was driven ashore in the River Avon. She was on a voyage from Quebec City, Province of Canada to Bristol, Gloucestershire. She was refloated on 15 August and taken into Bristol.
Sam	(United Kingdom of Great Britain and Ireland) Hong Kong	The ship was wrecked in the Lanyit Islands before 4 August. Her crew were rescued by a Chinese junk.
Tunbridge	United Kingdom	The steamship was driven ashore in the Humber. She was on a voyage from Hull to Rochester, Kent. She was refloated and resumed her voyage, but was later towed into Great Yarmouth, Norfolk with damaged machinery.
Venskabet	Norway	The galiot was abandoned in the North Sea. She was towed into Neuwerk by Two Brothers (United Kingdom), arriving on 27 August.
Waterwitch	(United Kingdom of Great Britain and Ireland) Van Diemen's Land	The ship was driven ashore at Port Sorrell before 13 August.
