= Comus (disambiguation) =

In Greek mythology, Comus or Komus is the god of festivity, revels, and nocturnal dalliances (the so-called Komastic rituals).

Comus or Komus may also refer to:

== People ==
- Comus, a pseudonym for R. M. Ballantyne
- Comus (Nicolas Philippe Ledru), a noted magician of the late 18th century

== Locations ==
- Comus, Aude, a commune of the Aude département in France
- Comus, Maryland, United States, an unincorporated community in Montgomery County

== Musical instruments ==
- Komus (or komuz), an Altai name for jaw harp. See also Music of the Altai Republic
- Kai-komus (or komus), a Shors' name for Topshur

== Other uses ==
- Comus (John Milton), a 1634 masque by John Milton
- Comus (Arne), a 1738 masque by Thomas Arne
- Comus (Handel), a 1745 short version of Milton's masque
- Comus (band), a progressive folk band
- Comus, a 1996 children's book by Margaret Hodges
- Comus Bassington, the central character in Saki's novel The Unbearable Bassington (1912)
- Komus (company), a Russian chain store and manufacturing company
- HMS Comus, the name of several ships of the Royal Navy
- Mistick Krewe of Comus, the oldest active New Orleans Mardi Gras krewe
