= Dorn =

Dorn (German for thorn) is a German/Austrian and Dutch/Flemish surname.

== People ==
- Amanda Dorn, Australian politician
- Angela Dorn-Rancke, née Dorn, German politician
- August T. Dorn (1849–1923), American politician
- David Dorn (1942–2020), African-American retired police chief murdered after interrupting a burglary
- Dieter Dorn (born 1935), German theatre director
- Dolores Dorn (1934–2019), American film actor
- Edward John Dorn (1854–1937), United States naval officer and Governor of Guam
- Ed Dorn (1929–1999), American poet
- Florian Dorn (born 1986), German politician
- Friedrich Ernst Dorn (1848–1916), German physicist
- Francis E. Dorn (1911–1987), member of the United States House of Representatives
- George W. Dorn (1836–1891), President of the Chico Board of Trustees in 1872
- Gerhard Dorn (c. 1530–1584), Belgian philosopher, translator, alchemist, physician and bibliophile
- Heinrich Dorn (1804–1892), German conductor and composer
- Ivan Dorn (born 1988), Ukrainian singer, DJ, TV presenter and producer
- Jennifer Dunbar Dorn, English writer and filmmaker
- Joel Dorn (1942–2007), music producer
- Johannes Albrecht Bernhard Dorn (1805–1881), German orientalist
- Ludwik Dorn (1954–2022), Polish politician
- Luke Dorn (born 1982), rugby player
- Michael Dorn (born 1952), American actor
- Myles Dorn (born 1998), American football player
- Robert C. Dorn, New York politician
- Roosevelt F. Dorn (born 1935), mayor
- Rüdiger Dorn (born 1969), game designer
- Thea Dorn (born 1970), German writer
- Walter Dorn (born 1961), scientist, educator, author and researcher
- Willian Dorn (born 1994), Brazilian futsal player
- William Jennings Bryan Dorn (1916–2005), American politician
- Wolfram Dorn (1924–2014), German politician
- Wulf Dorn (born 1969), German novelist

== Fictional characters ==
- Chris Dorn and son Kurt Dorn, wheat farmers in Zane Grey's 1919 novel The Desert of Wheat
- Eliot Dorn, on the American crime drama series and soap opera The Edge of Night
- Rogal Dorn, one of the twenty primarchs and leader of the Imperial Fists in tabletop game Warhammer 40,000
- Roger Dorn (played by Corbin Bernsen), in the films Major League (1989), Major League II (1994) and Major League: Back to the Minors (1998)

== See also ==
- Van Dorn (disambiguation), which includes a list of people with the surname Van Dorn or van Dorne
