= Università Leonardo da Vinci =

Private university

Coordinates: 42.3806°N 14.2085°E

Leonardo da Vinci University
- Università telematica Leonardo da Vinci
- Motto: Oggi, l'uninversità di domani
- Type: Public/Private
- Established: 27 October 2004; 22 years ago
- President: Sergio Caputi
- Rector: Giampiero Di Plinio
- Students: 920
- Location: Torrevecchia Teatina, Italy
- Website: www.unidav.it/

The Leonardo da Vinci University (Italian: Università telematica Leonardo da Vinci), often simply abbreviated as "Unidav" is a private university founded in 2004 in Torrevecchia Teatina, Italy. It was created and promoted by the D'Annunzio University of Chieti–Pescara. Legally recognized, the degrees obtained have the same value as those issued by traditional universities, and it was established by ministerial decree by the MIUR on 27 October 2004.

== Headquarters ==
The secretariat's headquarters in Palazzo Veneziani in Chieti.

It is located in a modern building behind Piazza San Rocco in the municipality of Torrevecchia Teatina, at Piazza San Rocco 2. The building is next to the parish church of San Rocco and the historic 18th-century Palazzo dei Marchesi Valignani di Chieti, built by Federico Valignani, which is also often used for university courses.

A telematic secretariat office, also used for graduation ceremonies, was inaugurated in Palazzo Veneziani in the historic center of Chieti.

== Faculties and Departments ==
The university is divided into a single department: Humanities, Law, and Economics.

The university offers a three-year degree program in Education and Training Sciences, a single-cycle master's degree program in Law, and one in Economics. The three-year degree program in Education and Training Sciences offers two curriculum tracks: Social Educator and Educator in Childcare Services.

The single-cycle master's degree program in Law offers tracks in: Legal Professions, Public Administration Law, Criminal Justice Law, and Business Law and Economics.

The Master's Degree Course in Economics aims to respond to the main trends in the contemporary competitive landscape (internationalization, governance of new technologies and digitization processes, healthcare management, etc.) through the methodologies and tools typical of economic sciences.

The University also offers first and second level master's degrees in Education and Training, Health and Wellbeing, Nutrition and Sports Medicine, as well as numerous advanced and specialization courses.

== Organization ==
=== Faculties ===
- Faculty of Education Sciences
- Falculty of Law
- Faculty of Economics

== See also ==
- List of Italian universities
- Torrevecchia Teatina - Chieti
- MIUR - Ministry of Education, University and Research
- D'Annunzio University of Chieti–Pescara
