= Ettore Recchi =

Italian academic

- Born: Ettore Recchi
- Occupation: Sociologist
- Title: Professor of Sociology

Academic background
- Education: University of Florence
- Alma mater: European University Institute
- Website: http://www.ettorerecchi.eu/

Ettore Recchi is an academic and Director of the MA and PhD program in Sociology at Sciences Po Paris as well as a part-time professor at the Migration Policy Centre of the European University Institute in Florence. His research focuses on human mobility, social stratification, elites and European integration.

== Career ==
Recchi studied Political science at the University of Florence in 1990 before receiving his PhD in Social and Political Sciences (with distinction) from the European University Institute in 1996. From 1993–2002 he was assistant professor of sociology at the University of Florence and then associate professor of urban sociology from 2002 to 2009. Between 2005 and 2009 he was also co-director of the Summer School on Migration and Development at the European University Institute. In 2009, he became Professor of political sociology at the University of Chieti-Pescara before becoming professor of sociology at Sciences Po Paris in 2014. In addition to his role at Sciences Po Paris, he is also a part-time professor at the Migration Policy Centre with European University Institute.

Recchi was coordinator for European Commission funded PIONEUR, MOVEACT, and EUCROSS projects focusing on migration and transnationalism in the European Union. In 2020, he designed and directed surveys of migrant populations in Italy and spatial mobility section of the French ELIPSS longitudinal study. In the same year, he directed two projects on COVID-19, "The Airport Factor: Assessing the Impact of International and National Aviation Mobility on the Spread of Covid-19” and “Faire face au Covid-19: Distanciation sociale, cohesion, et inégalité dans la France de 2020”. The first project studies the impact of commercial flights on the spread of the coronavirus and the second, which received funding from the French National Research Agency, studies the COVID-19 lockdown experience in France.

Recchi is a member of the Scientific Council of the French Institute for Demographic Studies and has been published in English, Italian, French, German, Spanish and Dutch, including books and journal articles.

== Selected publications ==
- Mobile Europe: The theory and practice of free movement in the EU, Houndmills, Basingstoke, Hampshire : Palgrave Macmillan, 2015.
- Everyday Europe: Social transnationalism in an unsettled continent (with Adrian Favell, Fulya Apaydin et al.), Bristol : Policy press, 2019
- 'The Citizenship Gap in European Societies: Conceptualizing, Measuring and Comparing ‘Migration Neutrality’across the EU', International Migration, 2016, Vol. 54, No. 6, pp. 181–200.
- Gabrielli, L., Deutschmann, E., Natale, F., Recchi, E., & Vespe, M. 'Dissecting global air traffic data to discern different types and trends of transnational human mobility', EPJ Data Science, 2019, Vol. 8, No. 1, pp. 1–24.
- Recchi, E. et al. 'The "Eye of the Hurricane" Paradox: An Unexpected and Unequal Rise of Well-Being During the Covid-19 Lockdown in France', Research in Social Stratification and Mobility, 2020, Vol. 68, 100508.
