= Carlo Vecce =

Italian academic (born 1959)

Carlo Vecce (born 1959) is an Italian academic who is Professor of Italian Literature in the University of Naples "L'Orientale", he taught also in the University of Pavia (School of Palaeography and Musical Philology, Cremona), the D'Annunzio University of Chieti–Pescara and the University of Macerata. Abroad he was visiting professor at Paris 3 (Sorbonne Nouvelle) (2001) and University of California Los Angeles (UCLA) (2009).

He received his doctorate at the Catholic University of Milan with a dissertation directed by Giuseppe Billanovich, his research focused on Renaissance Literature and Civilization in Italy and Europe, mainly in the history of intellectual workshops in the dawn of the Modern Age, and in relationships between languages (literature and visual culture). Among the authors he researched are: Iacopo Sannazaro, Pietro Bembo, Lorenzo Valla, Erasmo da Rotterdam, Girolamo Aleandro, Antonio De Ferrariis detto Galateo.

Under the guidance of Carlo Pedretti, Vecce worked on the manuscripts of Leonardo da Vinci, publishing the Book on Painting (Codex Urbinas, 1995) and of Codex Arundel (London, British Library, 1998). He published also an anthology of Leonardo's writings (1992), and a biography Leonardo translated in several languages (1998, new ed. 2006). In 1994, he was appointed as a member of "Commissione Vinciana".

He collaborated on the exhibitions of Leonardo's drawings and manuscripts at the Louvre (Paris, 2003) and the Metropolitan Museum (New York, 2003), and the exhibitions on Michelangelo at Kunsthistorisches Museum (Vienna, 1999) and Pietro Bembo (Padova, 2013). Vecce organized the exhibition of Leonardo's drawings from Codex Atlanticus in the Ambrosian Library about fables and tales (Milan, 2013). Under the patronage of UNESCO, he organized also the international conference I mondi di Leonardo (Milan, 2002).

Among his creative publications are the poetry collection Feuilles (Bruxelles, 1983), the dialogue Coblas. Il mistero delle sei stanze (with Alessandro Fo and Claudio Vela) (Milano, Scheiwiller, 1986), and the poem Viaggio in Québec ("Caffé Michelangiolo", a. XIV, n. 2, maggio-agosto 2009, pp. 24–26); Other works for theatre include La luna capovolta. Sogni di Girolamo Cardano (first performance: Macerata, 2002), Compagne di classe (adapted from Scuola normale femminile by Matilde Serao; first performance: Napoli, Liceo Fonseca, 2011), and Umbra profunda. Frammenti della giovinezza di Giordano Bruno (Ginevra, 2013).

Vecce is fluent in French and English.

== Selected publications ==
- Vecce, Carlo (2009). Piccola storia della letteratura italiana (in Italian). Naples: Liguori. OCLC 464740764.
- Vecce, Carlo (1988). Iacopo Sannazaro in Francia: scoperte di codici all'inizio del XVI secolo (in Italian). Padua: Antenore. OCLC 019364213.
- Bramante, Donato (1995). Vecce, Carlo (ed.). Sonetti e altri scritti (in Italian). Rome: Salerno. ISBN 88-8402-170-7.
- Vecce, Carlo (2005). "Le biografie antiche di Leonardo" [Leonardo's ancient biographies]. In Arrighi, Vanna; Bellinazzi, Anna; Villata, Edoardo (eds.). Leonardo da Vinci: la vera immagine: documenti e testimonianze sulla vita e sull'opera [Leonardo da Vinci: the true image: documents and testimonies on life and work] (in Italian). Florence: Giunti. ISBN 88-09-04519-X.
- Vecce, Carlo (2006). Leonardo (in Italian). Foreword by Carlo Pedretti. Rome: Salerno. ISBN 88-8402-548-6.
- Vecce, Carlo (2023). Il sorriso di Caterina: la madre di Leonardo (in Italian). Florence: Giunti. ISBN 978-88-09-96423-5.
