= Nature Reserve Pineta Dannunziana =

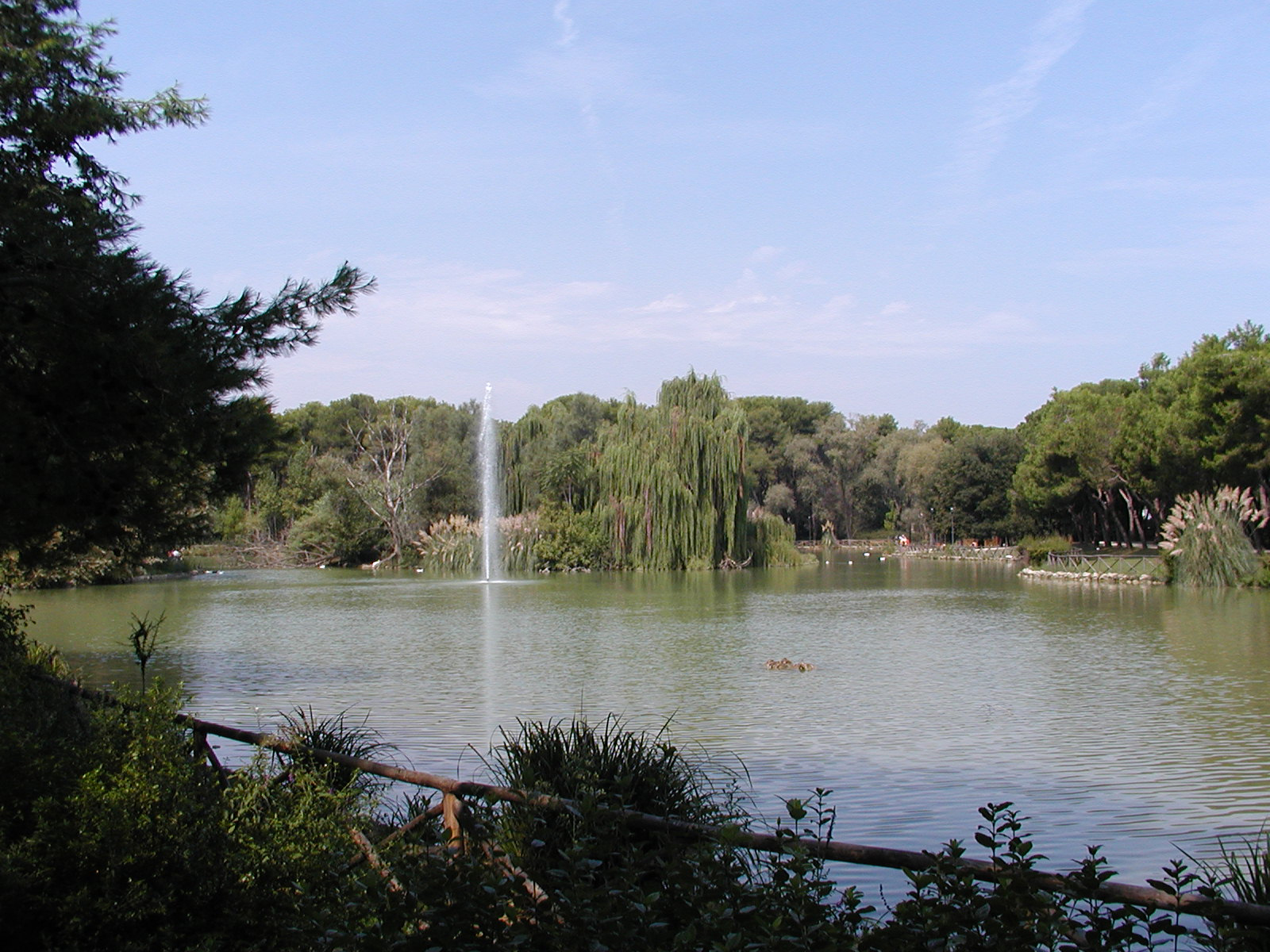
- View of the Nature Reserve Pineta Dannunziana
- Interactive map of Nature Reserve Pineta Dannunziana
- Location: Pescara, Abruzzo, Province of Pescara, Italy
- Coordinates: 42°27′6.095″N 14°14′8.027″E
- Area: 53 ha (130 acres)
- Established: 2000
- Governing body: Comune of Pescara

The Nature Reserve Pineta Dannunziana (informally known as D'Avalos Park) is a 53-hectare (130-acre) nature reserve located in Pescara, Abruzzo, Italy. It was established in 2000.

== History ==
In 1528, Charles V, Holy Roman Emperor, granted the entire area corresponding to the present town of Pescara to Costanza d'Avalos, Duchess of Francavilla. In 1700, the extension of the forest was resized due to the growing urbanization of the city.

In 2001, the Abruzzo region established a nature reserve, protecting the pine forest and covering an area of 53 hectares. The park includes some buildings of historical value, such as the former Aurum factory, a horseshoe-shaped building designed by Giovanni Michelucci in 1939, as well as some Art Nouveau villas. The nature reserve is also the house of the D'Annunzio Theater and the Flaiano Auditorium.
