= Giada Trebeschi =

Italian writer (born 1973)

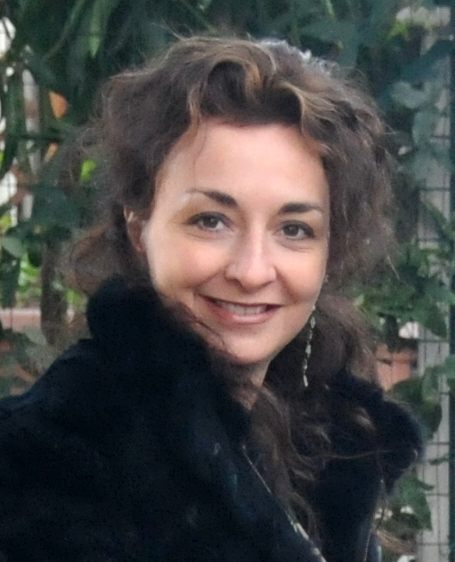
- Born: 8 August 1973 (age 53); Reggio Emilia, Italy
- Education: Laurea in Lingue e Letterature Straniere, Laurea in Lettere Moderne, Ph.D. in Storia del Mezzogiorno e dell'Europa mediterranea dal medioevo all'età contemporanea
- Alma mater: Università degli Studi G. D'Annunzio Chieti – Pescara, Università della Basilicata
- Occupation: Writer
- Writing career
- Language: Italian, English, French, German, Spanish
- Genre: Historical fiction
- Website: www.trebeschi.name

Giada Trebeschi (born 8 August 1973) is an Italian author of historical fiction, thrillers, theater plays and screenplays. Her novels being based on true historical events touch various topics and periods. In addition she publishes some very short stories on her blog in English and Italian.

== Biography ==
Giada Trebeschi only coincidentally was born in Reggio Emilia as her mother visited her family in the vicinity. In fact the parents, her father Alberto Trebeschi, an engineer and business man and her mother Anna Maria Francesconi-Trebeschi a specialist for ancient furniture, lived in Bologna, Italy, which, even after moving several times, Giada Trebeschi refers to as "her city". Here she also went to the school of the Dominicans from early age till high school.

Her father first guided her into the direction of natural science even though, already as a teenager, she took pleasure in humanistic subjects like Literature and History of Art and thanks to one of her teachers, Sister Ignazia, she grew very fond of History.

From very early stage she was a ravenous reader and her father encouraged this attitude feeding her hunger with many different genres so that at the age of twelve she already had read, among others, Hemingway's The old man and the sea, nearly all Emilio Salgari and Jules Verne novels, Dumas's The Three Musketeers and Italo Calvino's The Cloven Viscount, The nonexistent Knight and The Baron in the Trees. Very early in her life she started learning foreign languages and, in order to do it correctly and with adequate pronunciation, she went to England and France for some time before she turned eighteen.

At the age of nineteen the family moved to Pescara, Italy where she also went to G. D'Annunzio University. Being fascinated by international Literature and, based on her curiosity for other places and cultures, she decided to study Foreign Languages and Literature.

On 27 November 1996 she graduated in foreign languages cum laude at the university of Pescara and exactly two years later on 27 November 1998 she graduated a second time in Italian Literature and History of Art at the University of Chiet.

In 1994 she initiates a theater University group called The Merry Devils Group of Players with the goal of putting on stage plays in original language, initially in English and later, from 1997 to 2002 also in French, Spanish, German and Italian.

As an actress she went on stage with Shakespearian plays like Much Ado About Nothing, A Midsummer Night's Dream, 12th Night, Marlowe's Faustus and, in 2002, she is Katarina in The Taming of the Shrew.

Based on these experiences in 2002 she starts writing for the theatre with her first play Nouvelle – Omaggio a D´Annunzio being a theatre-dance opera. Her intensive experience as an actress helps her to write for the stage and many of her original plays as well as her translations and adaptations are produced and taken on stage locally and on Italian tournées.

From 1998 to 2005 Giada Trebeschi worked as an assistant of Modern and Contemporary History at G. D'Annunzio University in Pescara. These years are frustrating and inspiring for her at the same time whereas 2005 becomes a key year in her life, in February she accomplishes her Ph.D. in History at the University of Basilicata in Potenza, Italy, in May she publishes her first novel Gli Ezzelino. Signori della Guerra and in June she marries and moves to Switzerland.

While building up her family, starting to learn German and spending some time in the Goethe city of Weimar, in 2008 her second novel, Le donne del Grimorio, a book about three generations of witches, is published.

In 2012, the year she starts to add Spanish to her collection of foreign languages she also moves to Spain and her third novel: La Dama Roja is published in Spanish.

Since 2014 Giada Trebeschi is living in Germany whilst she is present on various literature festivals in Italy presenting authors like Wulf Dorn, Petros Markaris, Tim Willocks and many others, making use of her language skills and international experience.

In 2020 she starts "La rubrica delle parole desuete" becoming a cultural influencer with more than 160.000 followers on Facebook.

== Awards ==
Finalist for "Gli Ezzelino. Signori della guerra" – Campiello – Opera Prima 2006.

First Prize for the unpublished novel "L'autista di Dio" – Giallo Garda 2017.

Special Prize of the jury for the historical novel "Il vampiro di Venezia" – Garfagnana in giallo 2017.

First prize historical thriller for the novel "L'autista di Dio" Garfagnana in giallo – Barga noir 2018.

Special prize of the popular jury Palmastoria 2018 for the novel "Il vampiro di Venezia".

Honour award Premio letterario internazionale città di Cattolica 2020 for the novel "Undici Passi".

Best Historical Setting for the novel "La bestia a due schiene" Garfagnana in giallo – Barga noir 2021.

== Published work ==
- Gli Ezzelino. Signori della Guerra, (The Ezzelinos, Lords of War), Firenze Libri 2005, ISBN 978-8872561379 (Italian)
- Le Donne del Grimorio, (The Women of the Book of Shadows), Firenze Libri 2008, ISBN 978-8851717247 (Italian)
- La Dama Roja, (The Red Lady), Bóveda 2012, ISBN 978-8415497172 (Spanish)
- La Dama Rossa, (The Red Lady), Mondadori 2014, ISBN 978-8804634461 (Italian)
- Elisabetta allo specchio, (Elizabeth at the mirror), Aracne 2015, ISBN 978-8854886902 (Italian)
- L'emigrante, (The emigrant), in Meglio non morire d'estate anthology chosen by Cristina Marra, Giulio Perrone Editore 2016, ISBN 978-8860044310 (Italian)
- Omaggio al Bardo, (Homage to the Bard), Erba Moli Editore 2016, ISBN 978-8894039030 (Italian)
- La punta di fuoco, in Free Zone anthology chosen by Nuela Celli, Echos edizioni 2017, ISBN 978-8898824847 (Italian)
- Il vampiro di Venezia, Oakmond Publishing 2017, ISBN 978-3-96207-888-1 (Italian)
- Essere o non essere Shakespeare, Oakmond Publishing 2017, ISBN 978-3-96207-005-2 (Italian)
- L'Autista di Dio, Oakmond Publishing 2018, ISBN 978-3-96207-112-7 (Italian)
- In principio era KAOS, Illustrator: Valeria Corciolani, Oakmond Publishing 2018, ISBN 978-3-96207-144-8 (Italian)
- Dio è morto, in Il bivio, anthology, Oakmond Publishing 2018, ISBN 978-3-96207-083-0 (Italian)
- L'amante del diavolo, Oakmond Publishing 2019, ISBN 978-3-96207-124-0 (Italian)
- L'eredità della luna, in Moon, anthology, Lisciani Libri 2019, ISBN 978-88-3351-079-8 (Italian)
- Undici passi, Oakmond Publishing 2019, ISBN 978-3-96207-177-6 (Italian)
- La bestia a due schiene, Oakmond Publishing 2020, ISBN 978-3-96207-214-8
- Gli Ezzelino. Signori della guerra, Oakmond Publishing 2021, ISBN 978-3-96207-240-7
- Il convento dei segreti, Newton Compton 2022, ISBN 9788822756473

== Theatre plays ==
- 2002 Nouvelle – Omaggio a D’Annunzio
- 2003 Itinerario Shakespeariano
- 2003 E le femmine…?! Tutte streghe!
- 2003 Viaggio Dantesco
- 2004 Ilio
- 2004 dell’Odissea
- 2005 Echeggiano nel Vento
- 2005 E le bomboniere??! No!
- 2006 Carpe Diem
- 2006 Arlecchino in cerca d´autore
- 2007 Dannunziana
- 2009 A letto con... Willy!
- 2010 Il gran teatro del mondo
- 2019 Sulla pelle del diavolo co-author Giorgio Rizzo
- 2021 Lo spettacolo delle desuete co-author Giorgio Rizzo

A yet unpublished screenplay, The Confession, dealing with the problem of ethnic cleansing Giada Trebeschi wrote in 2004 under the impression of the wars in former Yugoslavia, Darfur and many other places, initially sparked by an intensive conversation with a Bosnian actress at a reception in Berlin, Germany.
