= HMS Comus =

Five ships of the Royal Navy have been named HMS Comus, after the Greek god of festivity, revels and nocturnal dalliances:

- HMS Comus (1806) was a 22-gun post ship launched in 1806 and wrecked in 1816.
- HMS Comus was an 18-gun sloop launched in 1828 as HMS Comet. She was renamed HMS Comus in 1832 and was broken up in 1862.
- HMS Comus (1878) was a Comus-class screw corvette launched in 1878 and sold in 1904.
- HMS Comus (1914) was a C-class light cruiser launched in 1914 and sold in 1934.
- HMS Comus (R43) was a C-class destroyer launched in 1945. She was scrapped in 1958.

Also:

- The British privateer Comus, on 7 December 1800, captured a French chasse maree armed with three 3-pounder guns and carrying a cargo of hides. The next day, after an eight-hour chase, Comus captured the French letter of marque brig Rocou, which was pierced for 14 guns but armed with twelve 6 and 2-pounder guns, carrying cotton and rice from Cayenne to Bordeaux. Comus sent the brig into Guernsey and the chasse maree into Jersey. Comus herself was a small lugger of 32 tons burthen, armed with six 6-pounder guns and carrying a crew of 30 men.
