= Roberto Paganelli =

Italian physician, immunologist, and academic

- Born: Italy
- Occupations: Physician, clinical immunologist and academic

Academic background
- Education: Medical Degree, 1976; Specialization in Allergy and Clinical Immunology
- Alma mater: Uniersita’ La Sapienza

Roberto Paganelli is an Italian physician, clinical immunologist and academic. He is a Professor of Internal Medicine, UniCamillus International Medical University in Rome, Italy.

He formerly was a Professor of Internal Medicine at the D'Annunzio University of Chieti–Pescara.

Paganelli is most known for his work on allergy, immunology, inflammatory responses, mesenchymal stem cells and immunosenescence, and focusing on food allergy, immune complex diseases, immunoglobulin deficiencies, T-cell defects, and internal medicine.

Paganelli is the section editor-in-chief for the journal Pathogens.

== Education ==
Paganelli obtained his medical degree from Universita La Sapienza in 1976 and completed his specialization in Allergy and Clinical Immunology in 1984 from the same university.

== Career ==
After an internship at the 3rd Medical Clinic of the Universita La Sapienza in Rome, Paganelli spent four years as a Research Fellow at the UCL Great Ormond Street Institute of Child Health under the supervision of J.F. Soothill and R.J. Levinsky, until 1982 . He then began his academic journey in 1983, by joining the Università degli Studi dell'Aquila as an assistant professor, a role he held until 1984. In November 1984, he became part of the Universita’ La Sapienza, where he served as an assistant professor until 1999. Later, he joined Universita’ G. D’Annunzio and held the position of associate professor of Internal Medicine from 1999 to 2004, followed by a subsequent appointment as professor from 2004 to 2021.

At Universita’ G. D’Annunzio, Paganelli held multiple appointments, notably as the director of the School of Specialization in Rheumatology from 2007 to 2014, and the director of the School of Specialization in Allergy and Clinical Immunology from 2017 to 2021. He has served on the boards of Italian Society of Allergy, asthma and Clinical Immunology. He also served on the Immunodeficiency Committee at the World Allergy Organization.

He is a co-founder of StemTeCh, a scientific research group established in 2010, which focuses on the development of therapies in the field of stem cell technology. Additionally, in 2024, he co-founded ImmunITA, the Italian Association for Immunodeficiencies, where he serves as a member of the Scientific Committee. Paganelli is also a member of the World Allergy Organization's Committee on Primary Immunodeficiencies.

== Research ==
Paganelli's research has focused on the Immune system, allergic diseases, and immunopathology investigations. He has authored numerous publications spanning the areas of clinical immunology, inflammatory responses, and immunosenescence including over 250 articles in peer-reviewed journals.

=== Immunology ===
Paganelli's immunology research has provided insights into the immune system's intricacies and its role in health and disease. Centered on immune complex formation in patients with allergies and parasitic infections, his work demonstrated diverse immune responses to food proteins based on factors like age, health status, and allergies and devised a two-step technique to detect specific antigens in serum sample immune complexes. His research into the involvement of immune complexes in atopic dermatitis (AD) revealed that while immune system imbalances are present in AD, these disparities might be consequential rather than the fundamental cause of the condition. Furthermore, his investigation into the impacts of prolonged exposure to electromagnetic fields (ELMFs) from radio and television broadcasting stations on women's immune systems revealed diminished levels of diverse immune cell types, coupled with reduced production of crucial immune-regulating molecules. In collaborative research with several groups, he explored the impact of various metallic compounds on peripheral blood mononuclear cells, revealing that the cytotoxicity of these compounds is contingent upon their chemical speciation.

Paganelli's research has also focused on clinical immunology, notably examining the enduring effects of thymectomy on myasthenia gravis patients and assessing the allergenic properties of specific consumables like goat milk for certain groups - especially children. Most studies were done in Rome, while in Fernando Aiuti's Lab, and collaborations with local groups and scientists across Europe, where he organized the first meeting of the future European Society of Immunodeficiencies, and was on the steering Committee of the European Registry for Primary Immunodeficiencies. Focusing his research efforts on genetic factors in immunodeficiency, his 2005 study linked positive family history to a higher risk for immunoglobulin A deficiency and common variable immunodeficiency. Furthermore, his analysis of patients with ataxia-telangiectasia revealed a range of immune system abnormalities including deficiencies in specific helper T-cell subpopulations, intrinsic B-cell defects, modified suppressor T-cell activity, and impaired immunoglobulin production.

=== Inflammatory responses ===
Paganelli's research has explored the cellular and molecular mechanisms underlying inflammatory responses. In collaboration with GA Rabinovich, he investigated the extracellular and intracellular functions of galectins and provided insights into mechanisms for controlling cellular processes such as proliferation, signal transduction, and cell death. His 2009 study on tendinopathy pathogenesis highlighted the collaborative relationship between inflammation and degeneration and proposed that overuse-induced micro-tears in tendon fibers lead to a dynamic interplay of healing processes, inflammation, neovascularization, and nerve growth. Focusing on the correlation between aging, obesity, and inflammatory age-related ailments, his work examined how immune cells penetrate adipose tissue in cases of obesity, triggering inflammation and shifts in metabolism. Furthermore, his research contributed to the understanding pertaining to the immune response directed against the cow's milk antigen beta-lactoglobulin (beta-LG) within individuals affected by inflammatory bowel disease and explored the correlation between food antigens, inflammation, and rheumatoid arthritis. In his investigation of age-related decline in nerve conduction velocity (NCV) in the peripheral nervous system, his study found an association between reduced NCV, elevated inflammatory markers, and low Vitamin E levels, indicating that inflammation and oxidative stress might expedite the deterioration of peripheral nervous system function during aging. More recently in 2021, he assessed the impact of a 3-month diet excluding meat, gluten, and lactose on patients with longstanding rheumatoid arthritis, revealing reduced circulating leukocytes and neutrophils, along with lowered hs-CRP levels, indicating improved inflammation control. His more recent studies highlight the usefulness of Neutrophil-to-Lymphocyte ratios in assessing the resilience of the immune system in diseases and ageing.

=== Immunosenescence ===
Paganelli's immunosenescence research has contributed to the identification and characterization of various cytokines, their signaling pathways, and their release patterns. His collaborative work with Claudio Franceschi, Fagiolo and others revealed that both young and aged individuals maintain the ability of peripheral mononuclear cells to produce pro-inflammatory cytokines (IL-6, TNF-alpha, IL-1 beta) when stimulated, potentially impacting age-related pathological processes. In his evaluation of cytokine and chemokine expression in systemic sclerosis (SSc) patients using various biological specimens, his study established a correlation between certain cytokines and organ involvement, indicating that IL-6, IL-10, MDC, and MCP-1 exhibited varying associations with internal organ involvement. While investigating the immune profiles of healthy centenarians, he revealed altered T cell clone patterns in comparison to younger individuals, including a decreased prevalence of the Th1 pattern in CD4+ T cells, and also highlighted the complex cytokine environment changes accompanying the aging process. In his assessment of factors impacting Interleukin-1 beta (IL-1β) serum levels within a sizable and diverse population, he determined that these levels correlated with congestive heart failure, angina, serum Ca2+ levels, and a history of dyslipidemia. His 2019 study focused on the serological cytokine profile in cutaneous melanoma, underscoring the viable employment of these agents as indicators for tracking disease advancement and gauging therapeutic efficacy. His work in 2023 examined the immune alterations distinguishing different types of dementia and the role of responses to amyloid A-beta.

== Selected articles ==
- Fagiolo, U., Cossarizza, A., Scala, E., Fanales‐Belasio, E., Ortolani, C., Cozzi, E., ... & Paganelli, R. (1993). Increased cytokine production in mononuclear cells of healthy elderly people. European journal of immunology, 23(9), 2375–2378.
- Bellioni-Businco, B., Paganelli, R., Lucenti, P., Giampietro, P. G., Perbornc, H., & Businco, L. (1999). Allergenicity of goat's milk in children with cow's milk allergy. Journal of Allergy and Clinical Immunology, 103(6), 1191–1194.
- Rabinovich, G. A., Baum, L. G., Tinari, N., Paganelli, R., Natoli, C., Liu, F. T., & Iacobelli, S. (2002). Galectins and their ligands: amplifiers, silencers or tuners of the inflammatory response?. Trends in immunology, 23(6), 313–320.
- Giovannetti, A., Pierdominici, M., Mazzetta, F., Marziali, M., Renzi, C., Mileo, A. M., ... & Aiuti, F. (2007). Unravelling the complexity of T cell abnormalities in common variable immunodeficiency. The Journal of Immunology, 178(6), 3932–3943.
- Abate, M., Gravare Silbernagel, K., Siljeholm, C., Di Iorio, A., De Amicis, D., Salini, V., ... & Paganelli, R. (2009). Pathogenesis of tendinopathies: inflammation or degeneration?. Arthritis research & therapy, 11(3), 1–15.
- PAGANELLI, R; QUINTI, I; FAGIOLO, U; COSSARIZZA, A; ORTOLANI, C; GUERRA, E; SANSONI, P; PUCILLO, L P; SCALA, E; COZZI, E; BERTOLLO, L; MONTI, D; FRANCESCHI, C (1992-11-01). "Changes in circuIating B cells and immunoglobulin cIasses and subcIasses in a healthy aged popuIation". Clinical and Experimental Immunology. 90 (2): 351–354. doi:10.1111/j.1365-2249.1992.tb07954.x. ISSN 0009-9104. PMC 1554614.
- Trubiani, Oriana; Pizzicannella, Jacopo; Caputi, Sergio; Marchisio, Marco; Mazzon, Emanuela; Paganelli, Roberto; Paganelli, Alessia; Diomede, Francesca (2019). "Periodontal Ligament Stem Cells: Current Knowledge and Future Perspectives". Stem Cells and Development. 28 (15): 995–1003. doi:10.1089/scd.2019.0025. hdl:11380/1271194. ISSN 1547-3287. PMID 31017047.
- Gerli, Roberto; Monti, Daniela; Bistoni, Onelia; M. Mazzone, Anna; Peri, Giuseppe; Cossarizza, Andrea; Di Gioacchino, Mario; E. F. Cesarotti, Monica; Doni, Andrea; Mantovani, Alberto; Franceschi, Claudio; Paganelli, Roberto (2001-01-20). "Chemokines, sTNF-Rs and sCD30 serum levels in healthy aged people and centenarians". Mechanisms of Ageing and Development. First Conference of the EU Thematic Network Immunology and Ageing in Europe (ImAginE). 121 (1): 37–46. doi:10.1016/S0047-6374(00)00195-0. hdl:11380/305067. ISSN 0047-6374. PMID 11164458.
- Lombardi, Gemma; Paganelli, Roberto; Abate, Michele; Ireland, Alex; Molino-Lova, Raffaele; Sorbi, Sandro; Macchi, Claudio; Pellegrino, Raffaello; Di Iorio, Angelo; Cecchi, Francesca (2021-10-21). "Leukocyte-derived ratios are associated with late-life any type dementia: a cross-sectional analysis of the Mugello study". GeroScience. 43 (6): 2785–2793. doi:10.1007/s11357-021-00474-3. ISSN 2509-2715. PMC 8529862. PMID 34674153.
- Di Iorio, Angelo; Paganelli, Roberto; Abate, Michele; Barassi, Giovanni; Ireland, Alex; Macchi, Claudio; Molino-Lova, Raffaele; Cecchi, Francesca (2021-04-01). "Thyroid hormone signaling is associated with physical performance, muscle mass, and strength in a cohort of oldest-old: results from the Mugello study". GeroScience. 43 (2): 1053–1064. doi:10.1007/s11357-020-00302-0. ISSN 2509-2723. PMC 8110652. PMID 33219914.
