= Giovanni Gasbarrini =

Italian physician

Giovanni Gasbarrini (born 30 August 1936 in Padua) is an Italian physician whose work in the field of internal medicine, hepatology and gastroenterology earned him the 2013 lifetime achievement award of the United European Gastroenterology (UEG) association.

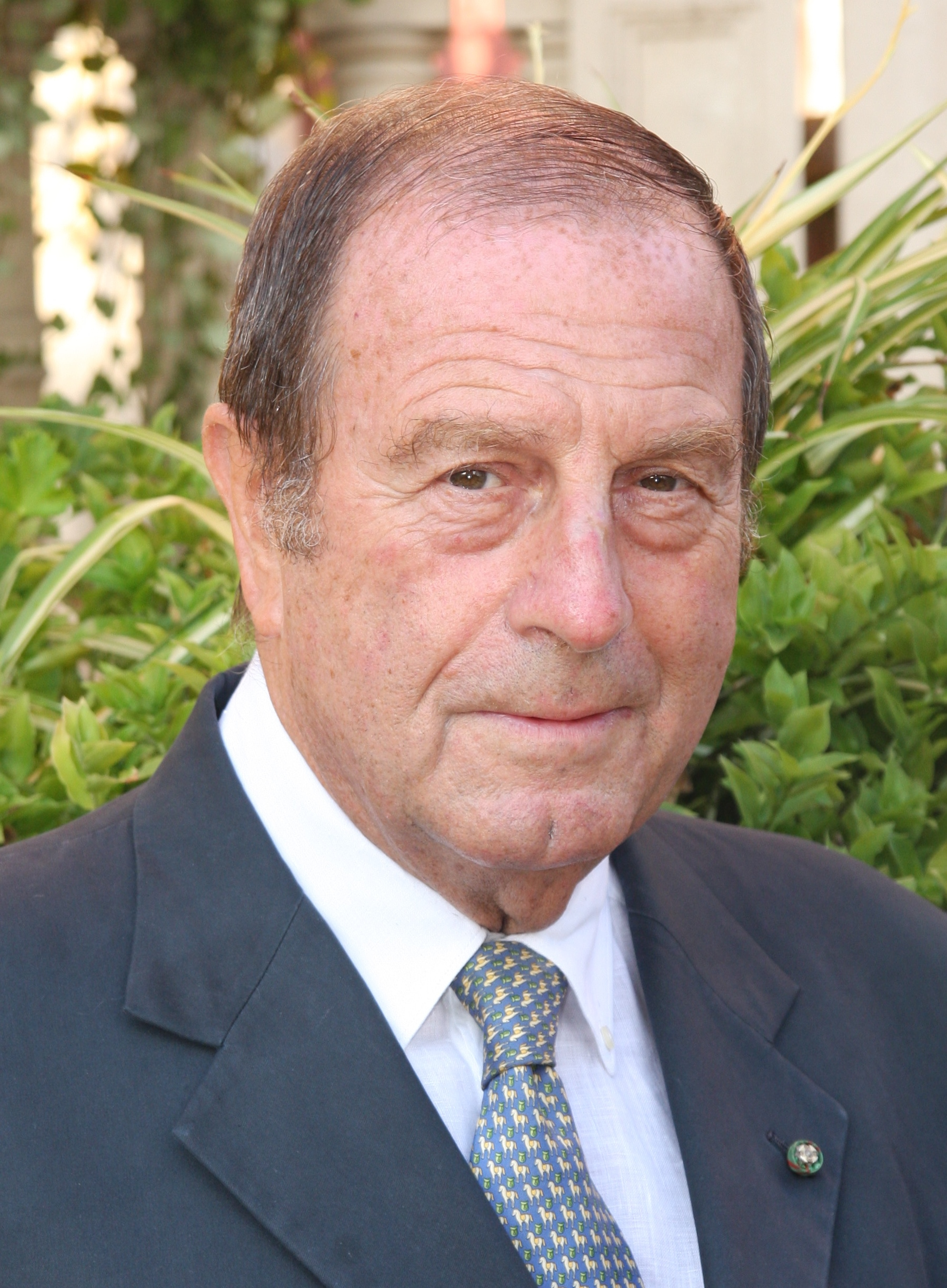
Giovanni Gasbarrini

== Biography ==
Giovanni Gasbarrini was born in Padua in 1936 to Elisabetta Tinozzi and Antonio Gasbarrini. The father Antonio - professor of internal medicine at the University of Padua and Bologna - was a famous Italian physician that laid the groundwork for modern internal medicine and gastroenterology, and was the founder of the Italian society of gastroenterology. During his childhood, Giovanni Gasbarrini developed a strong scientific interest for the medical subjects studied by his father Antonio, and after high school graduation in 1954 at the Luigi Galvani 'Liceo Classico' in Bologna, decided to continue his studies at the faculty of medicine in the same city. In 1960 he married Maria Luisa Di Paola, and they have three sons Antonio, Elisabetta and Alessandro.

== Scientific and academic activity ==
In 1960 Gasbarrini graduated from the University of Bologna with summa cum laude as medical doctor. He specialized in Gastroenterology and Internal Medicine at the same institution and started his academic career as assistant professor at the University of Bologna in 1964. Then, in 1970, he moved to the D'Annunzio University of Chieti–Pescara. Finally, he was appointed as Professor of Internal Medicine at the University of Bologna in 1977 and at the Catholic University of Rome in 1993. He was the Chairman of the Specialization School in Geriatrics and Gerontology at the University of Bologna, School of Medicine between 1980 and 1993, and of the Specialization School in Internal Medicine and Gastroenterology and Digestive Endoscopy at the Catholic University of Rome from 1993 onwards.

Gasbarrini's contributions to the field of contemporary internal medicine and gastroenterology are remarkable. He is a pioneer of pathophysiological research in a variety of gastric, intestinal and liver disorders at an international level. He is an active clinical researcher with a broad interest in gastrointestinal diseases such as peptic ulcer, inflammatory bowel disease, coeliac disease and malabsorption, liver diseases, small intestinal bacterial overgrowth, gastrointestinal oncology, pancreatic disease, alcohol-related disorders and genetic syndromes of the gastrointestinal tract, to name a few.

Gasbarrini has contributed much to scientific literature. He published more than 1000 peer-reviewed articles in international journals, which were cited over 36800 times, and he has h-index 96 as of December 2015, which is high considering that a significant part of his scientific articles were published before the internet era. He is in the list of the top Italian scientists of the VIA academy. He has been a member of many editorial boards and has served as editor of several gastroenterological journals. Among his scientific contributions are: the first electron microscopic studies of intestinal mucosa in coeliac disease and other malabsorption syndromes; studies of the role of Helicobacter pylori in autoimmune thrombocytopenia; research on the pathogenesis of biliary tract stones; studies of drug-induced and viral hepatitis and studies on small intestinal bacterial overgrowth.

Gasbarrini also made equally important contributions to education in gastroenterology, and to several European gastroenterology societies and organisations. He mentored and trained many clinicians, academic clinicians and basic researchers who are active in patient care and research in gastroenterology all over the world. He organized national and international scientific conferences and postgraduate and teaching courses, with a special focus on educational value for young people at the beginning of their careers. Besides being active in many national and international societies, he served as President of the European Association for Gastroenterology, Endoscopy and Nutrition (EAGEN), and as President of the European Helicobacter and Microbiota Study Group (EHMSG).

== Honours and awards ==
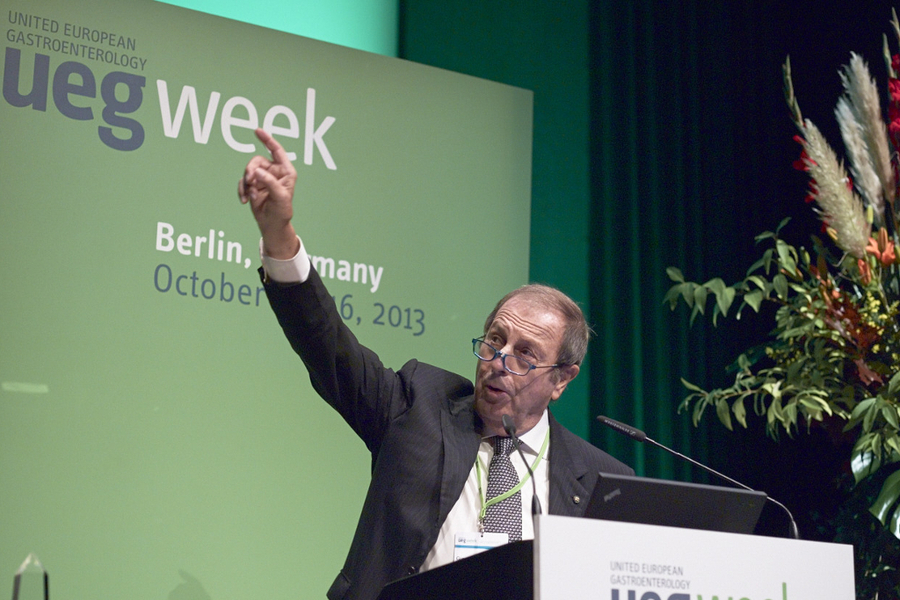
Giovanni Gasbarrini at the 2013 UEG Lifetime Achievement Award

- AISF (Italian society for the study of the liver) lifetime achievement
- Trisociety (Italian Society of Gastroenterology - Italian Society of Digestive Endoscopy - Italian Association of Hospital Gastroenterology) lifetime achievement
- Cavaliere di Gran Croce of the Italian Republic
- Honorary Member of Italian Society of Internal Medicine
- Lifetime achievement award of the United European Gastroenterology (UEG) association (2013)
- Several other awards for medical and general culture
