= Franco Gaetano Scoca =

Italian lawyer and professor (born 1935)

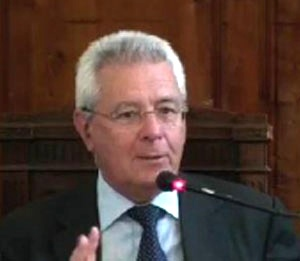
Franco Gaetano Scoca

Franco Gaetano Scoca (born 7 January 1935 in Rome) is an Italian lawyer and professor.

== Books ==
- Attività privata e potere amministrativo. Il modello della dichiarazione di inizio attività, Giappichelli Editore
- Manuale di Diritto Amministrativo, Giappichelli Editore
- La pubblica Amministrazione e la sua azione, Giappichelli Editore
- I servizi pubblici locali, Giappichelli Editore
- Accordi amministrativi tra provvedimenti e contratti, Giappichelli Editore
- Diritto Amministrativo 2011, Giappichelli Editore
- La rivista nel diritto, Giappichello Editore
- Una giustizia per la pubblica amministrazione, Giappichelli Editore
- Giustizia Amministrativa, Giappichelli Editore
