= European Network of Physiotherapy in Higher Education =

The European Network of Physiotherapy in Higher Education (ENPHE) is a non-profit association of leading physical therapy universities in Europe. ENPHE was set up in February 1995, with headquarters in Utrecht, Netherlands. The main objectives are to provide high quality physical therapy education in Europe and to improve links between association members in research, as well as postgraduate and continuing education.
