= Giardino dei Semplici, Chieti =

Botanical garden in Italy

Coordinates: 42°22′09.0″N 14°08′42.3″E

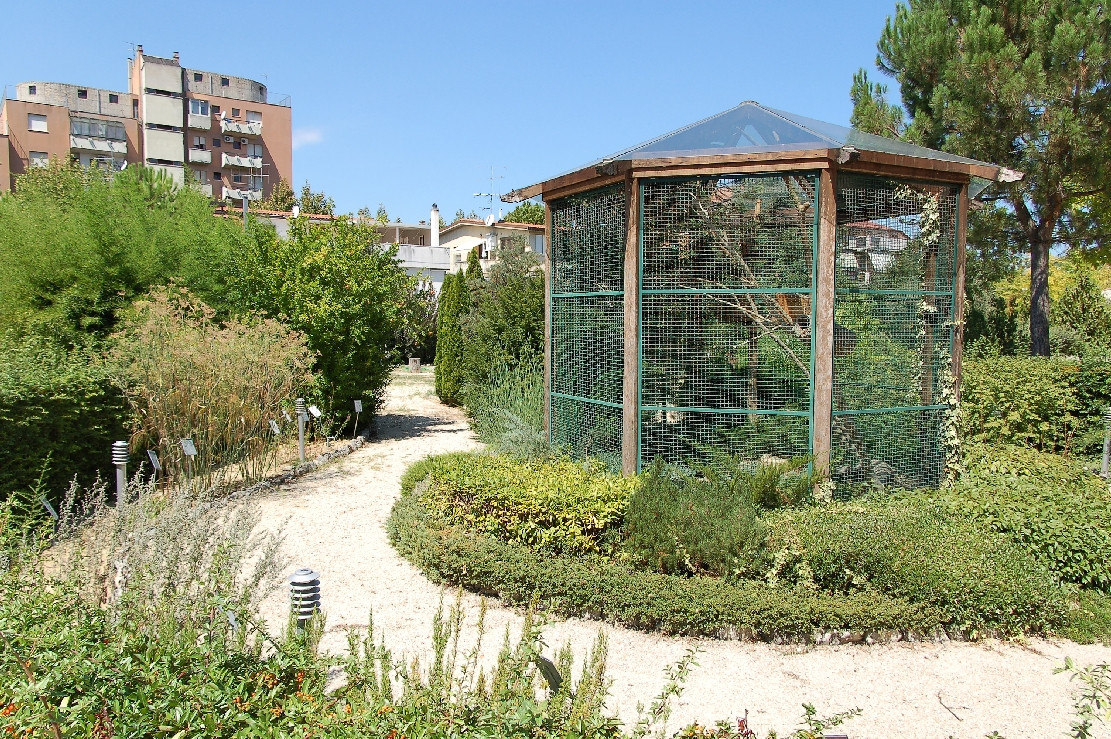
General view

The Giardino dei Semplici, also known as the Orto Botanico dell'Università D'Annunzio, is a botanical garden in Chieti, Abruzzo, central Italy, operated by the D'Annunzio University. It is officially recognized as an area of regional interest.

The garden is located on the southwest corner of the campus in Madonna delle Piane. It currently contains over 400 types of herbs and woody plants related to traditional medicine. It includes both native and exotic plants, although special attention is given to the endemic flora of Abruzzo and to the species that are at risk of extinction.

== See also ==
- List of botanical gardens in Italy
