= Ettore Paratore =

Italian Latinist

Ettore Paratore (23 August 1907 – 15 October 2000) was an Italian Latinist and academic.

Paratore was born in Chieti, Italy; his father was a doctor and science teacher, while his mother was a professor. He completed his studies in literatures at the University of Palermo in 1927. He later became a professor of Latin literature at the University of Catania. After moving to Rome, he started teaching Greek and Latin grammar at the Sapienza University of Rome.

Paratore wrote groundbreaking works about Latin writers such as Virgil, Tacitus and Petronius. He also focused his writings on the influences of Latin culture on the works by Italian writers as Dante Alighieri, Alessandro Manzoni and Gabriele D'Annunzio. Paratore was a member of the Lincean Academy.
