= Netval Research Universities Network =

Consortium of Italian education organisations

The Netval Research Universities Network is a consortium of 62 institutions of higher education that provides a forum for cooperation and exchange of information on higher education and research policies. Netval was set up in November 2002, with headquarters in Pavia and Lecco, Italy. Members of the Association are Italian universities involved in teaching and research, national associations of rectors and other organisations active in higher education and research.
