= Chieti Museum of Biomedical Sciences =

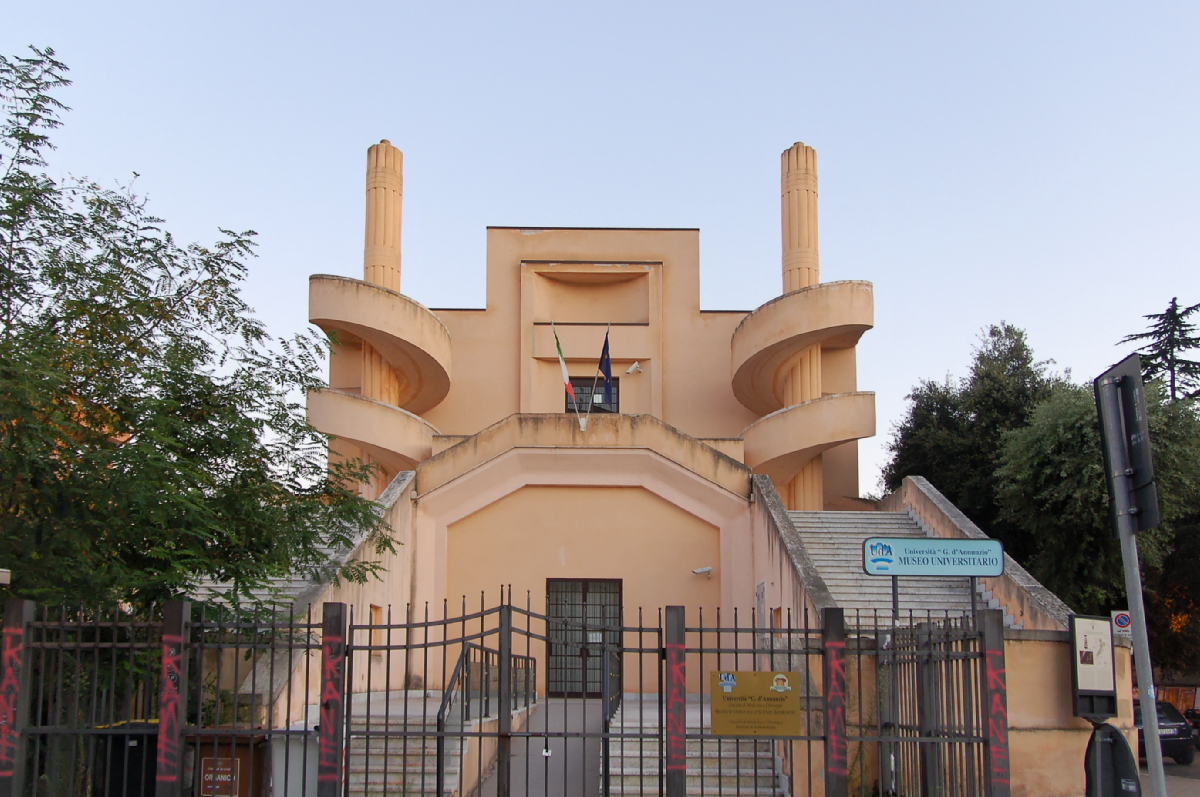
- Established: 1994
- Location: Piazza Trento e Trieste; Chieti, Italy
- Coordinates: 42°20′45″N 14°9′55″E
- Type: Medical museum
- Website: museo.unich.it/

The Chieti Museum of Biomedical Sciences is a medical museum, located in Chieti, Abruzzo. It was established in 1994 at Palazzo De Pasquale, promoted by Luigi Capasso. D'Annunzio University assumed governance of the Museum in 2010.

It is dedicated to the knowledge and dissemination of Natural Sciences and History of Science, focusing on biological and medical aspects arising from research in archaeology, medicine, anthropology and palaeontology. It spans an area of over 16,000 square feet (1,500 m^{2}). In 2005, the Museum of Biomedical Sciences moved to Palazzo Arnaldo Mussolini in the historic centre of Chieti.

It currently hosts a collections of over 19,000 records in the fields of palaeontology, prehistory, anthropology, botany and zoology. In addition, it includes scientific instruments as well as works of modern art. The Museum of Biomedical Sciences is a member of the International Council of Museums.
