= HMS Comus (1828) =

Sloop of the Royal Navy

History

United Kingdom
- Name: Comus
- Ordered: 15 May 1821
- Builder: Pembroke Dockyard
- Laid down: October 1826
- Launched: 14 August 1828
- Completed: 28 February 1829
- Commissioned: November 1828
- Fate: Broken up, 10 May 1862

General characteristics
- Class & type: Comet-class sloop
- Tons burthen: 462 16/94 bm
- Length: 113 ft 3 in (34.5 m) (gundeck); 92 ft 11 in (28.3 m) (keel)
- Beam: 31 ft 11 in (9.7 m)
- Depth: 8 ft (2.4 m)
- Complement: 125
- Armament: 2 × 6-pdr cannon; 16 × 32-pdr carronades

HMS Comus was an 18-gun sloop, the name ship of her class, built for the Royal Navy during the 1820s.

== Description ==
Comus had a length at the gundeck of 113 feet 3 inches (34.5 m) and 92 feet 11 inches (28.3 m) at the keel. She had a beam of 30 feet 11 inches (9.4 m), and a depth of hold of 8 feet (2.4 m). The ship's tonnage was 462 16/94 tons burthen. The Comet class was armed with a pair of 9-pounder cannon in the bow and sixteen 32-pounder carronades. The ships had a crew of 125 officers and ratings.

== Construction and career ==
Comus, the second ship of her name to serve in the Royal Navy, was ordered with the name of Comet on 15 May 1821, laid down in October 1826 at Pembroke Dockyard, Wales, and launched on 14 August 1828. She was completed on 28 February 1829 at Plymouth Dockyard and commissioned in November 1828. The ship was renamed Comus on 31 October 1832.

On 17 November 1833, Comus ran aground on the North Bank in Liverpool Bay during a voyage from Liverpool, Lancashire, England, to Dublin, Ireland.

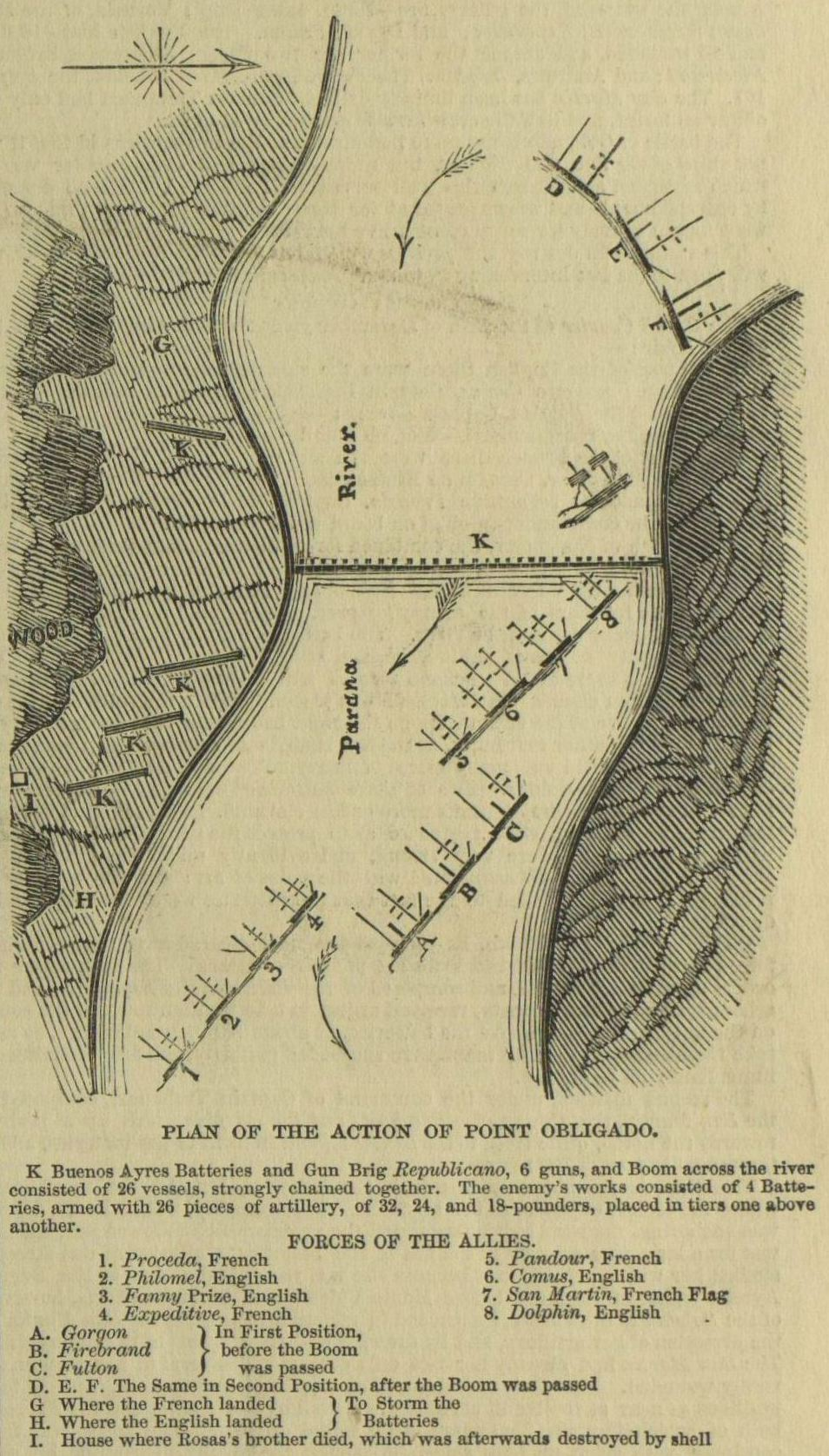
Comus in action at the Battle of Vuelta de Obligado in 1846

On 25 September 1847, Comus was driven ashore and sank near Montevideo, Uruguay. Subsequently refloated, she was repaired and returned to service.

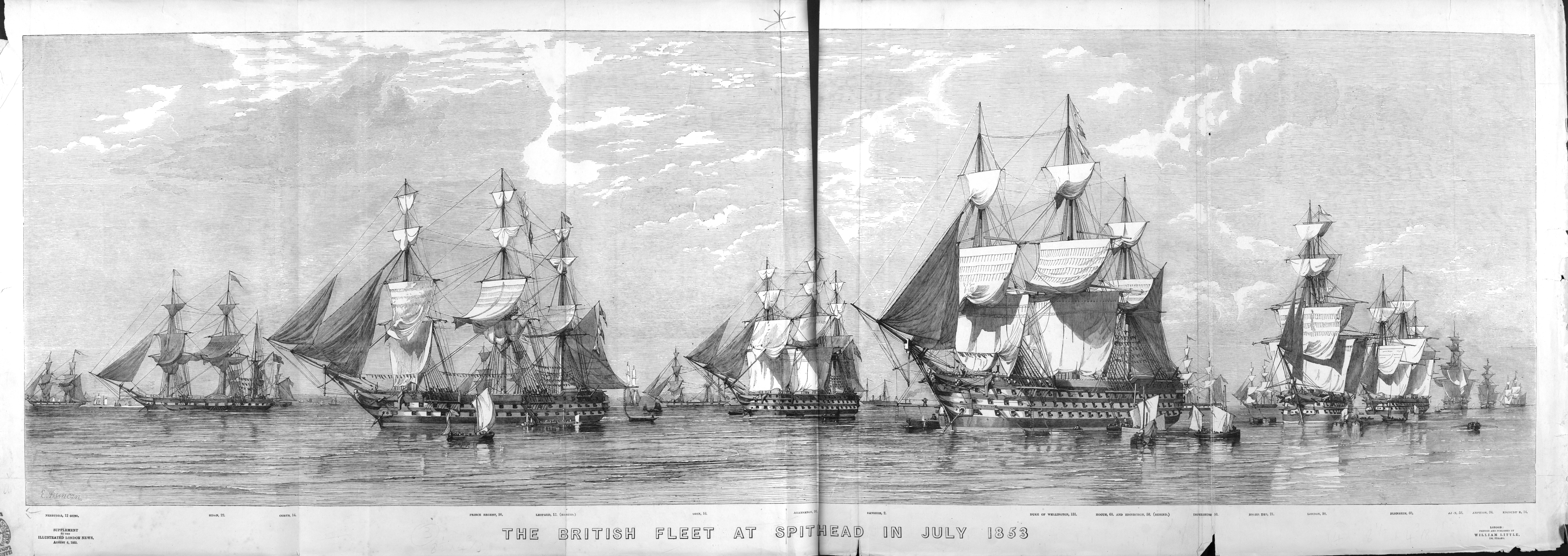
Comus at the Spithead Fleet Review on 15 July 1853

Comus was broken up on 10 May 1862.
