= Wulf Dorn =

German novelist

Wulf Dorn (born 20 April 1969 in Ichenhausen) is a German novelist who writes in the psychological thriller genre. He is best known for his novel Trigger, which was published in 2009.
