= Aurum (liqueur) =

Alcoholic beverages

- Type: Sweet alcoholic beverage
- Country of origin: Pescara, Abruzzo, Italy
- Flavour: citrus fruits

Aurum is a sweet orange-flavored Italian liqueur produced in Pescara since 1925. It is 40% alcohol by volume and it is made from aged brandy and a citrus fruit infusion consisting of orange rind, orange juice and saffron. The saffron serves to imbue it with a deep yellow coloration. Aurum has been described as a digestif. It goes well with sweets, especially with parrozzo, another specialty of Pescara. Other than as a drink, it is often used as a cake ingredient or as an addition to ice-cream.

== Etymology ==
The name of this liqueur was chosen by Amedeo Pomilio, the founder of the Aurum factory, upon suggestion by the poet and writer Gabriele D'Annunzio, with a reference to the ancient Roman origins of the recipe. The name derives from the pun between the Latin words aurum, which means gold, and aurantium, which means orange (fruit).

== Gallery ==
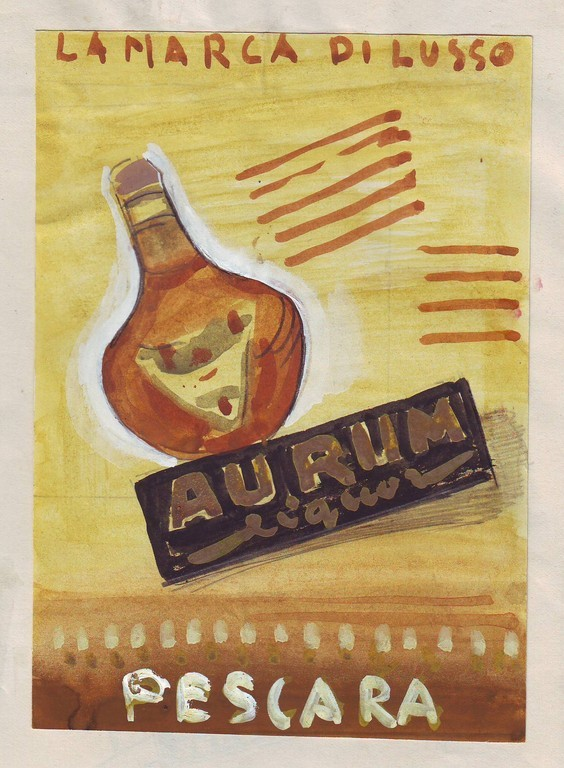
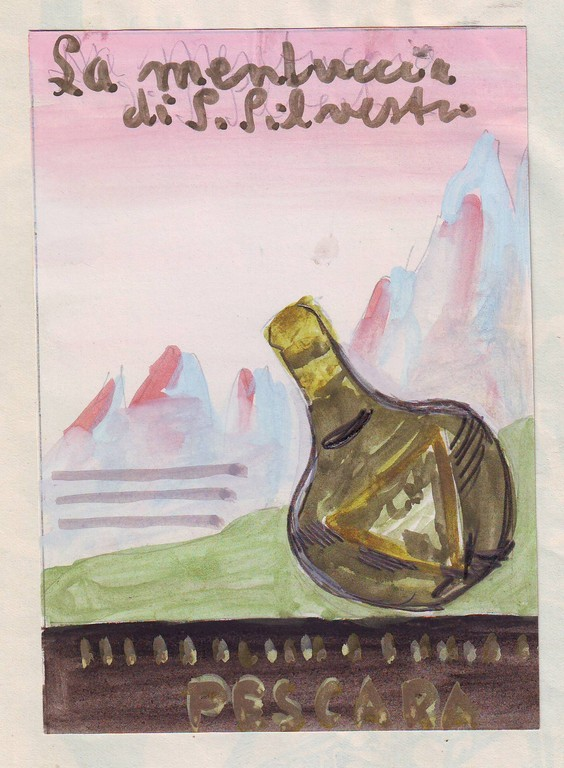
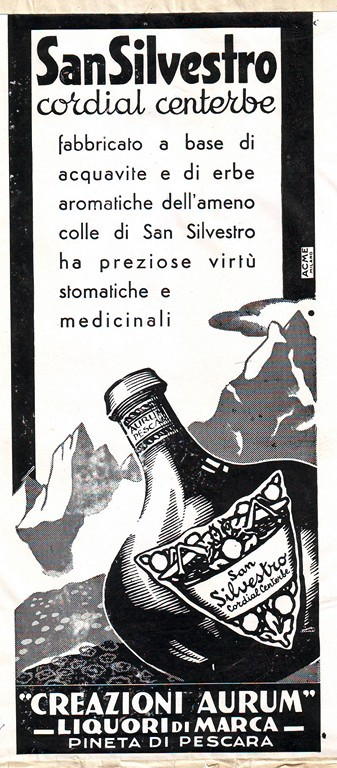
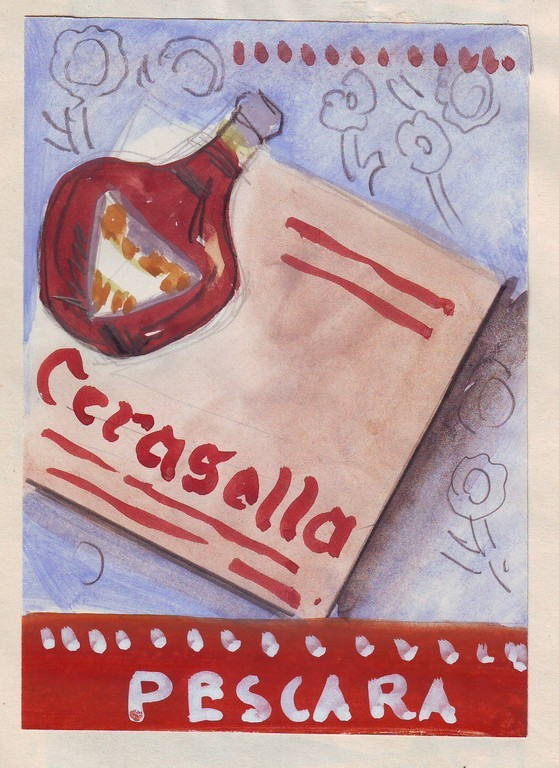
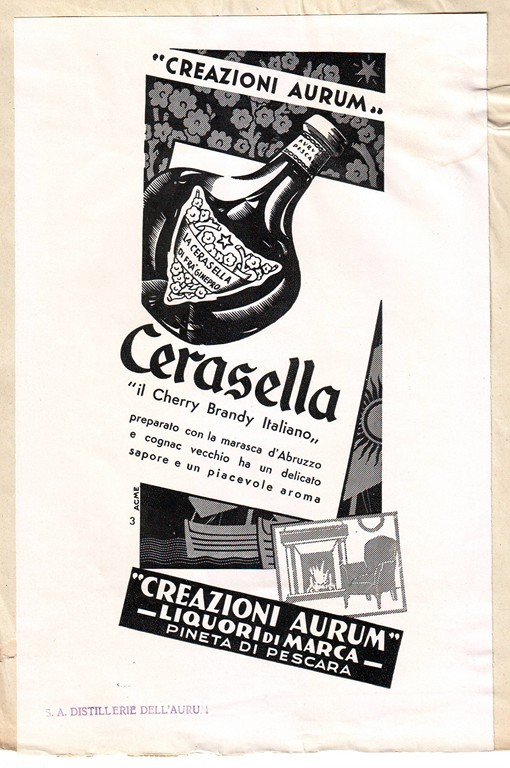
Advertising posters

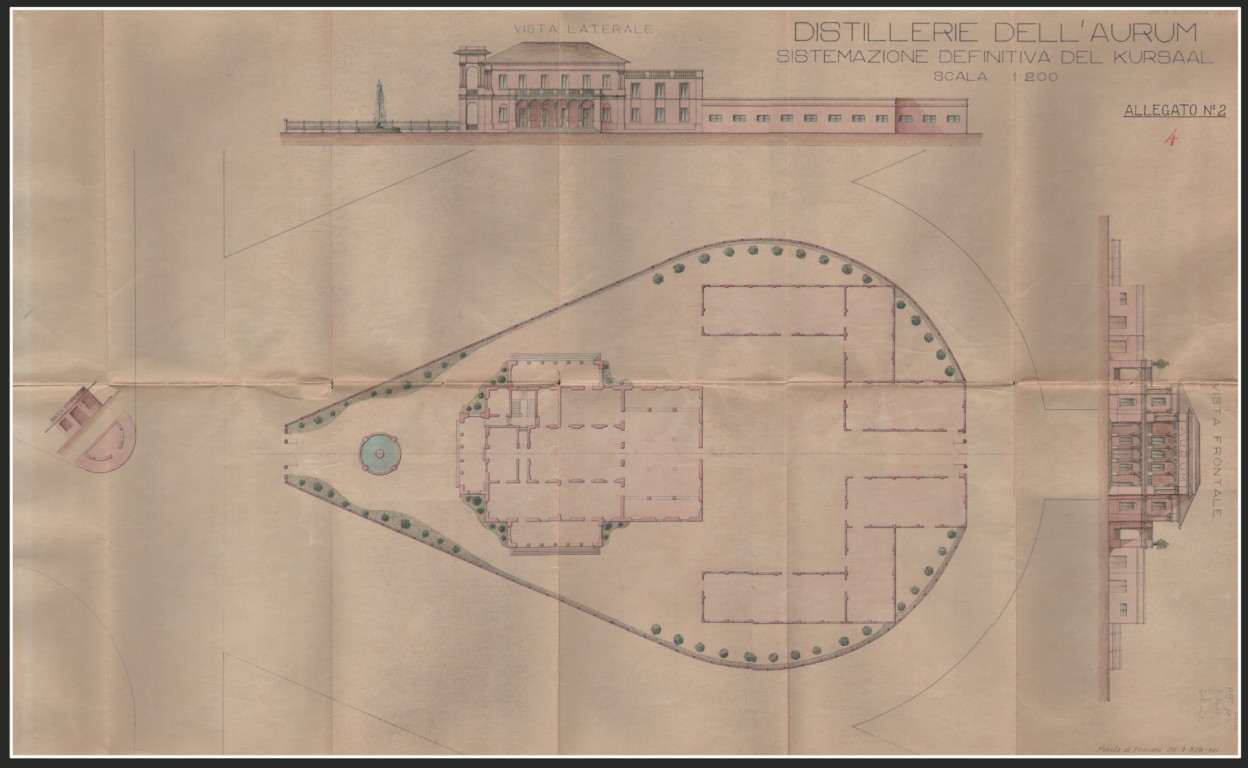
Floor plan of the distillery, Pescara 26 September 1938
