= Torrevecchia Teatina =

- Comune
- Comune di Torrevecchia Teatina
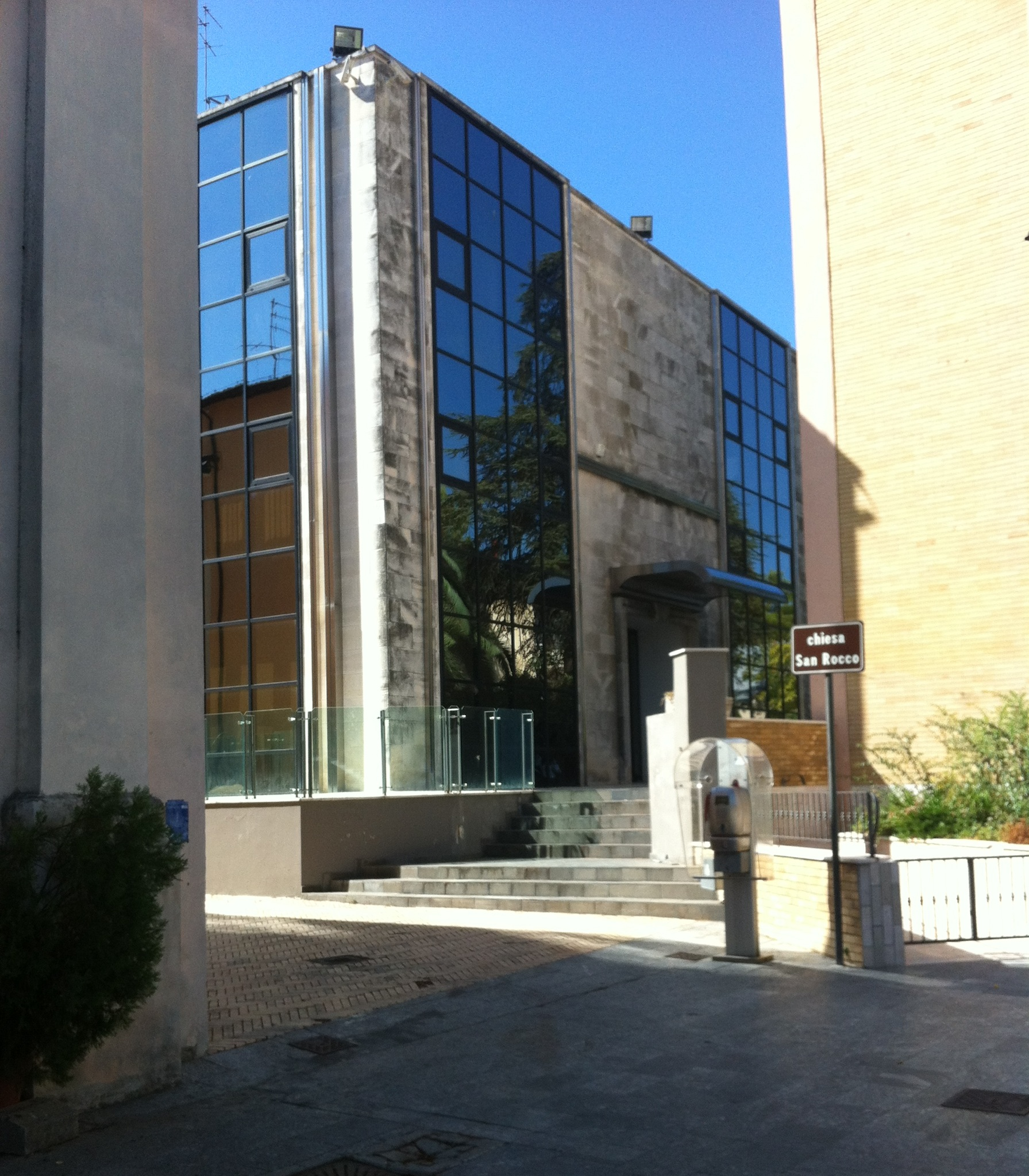
- Leonardo Da Vinci University

- Location within Italy Location within Abruzzo
- Coordinates: 42°23′N 14°12′E
- Country: Italy
- Region: Abruzzo
- Province: Chieti (CH)
- Frazioni: Castelferrato, Torremontanara

Area
  - Total: 14.60 km^{2} (5.64 sq mi)
- Elevation: 220 m (720 ft)

Population (2008)
  - Total: 4,030
  - Density: 276/km^{2} (715/sq mi)
- Demonym: Torrevecchiani or teatini
- Time zone: UTC+1 (CET)
  - Summer (DST): UTC+2 (CEST)
- Postal code: 66010
- Dialing code: 0871
- ISTAT code: 069094
- Saint day: 16 August
- Website: Official website

Torrevecchia Teatina is a comune and town in the Province of Chieti in the Abruzzo region of Italy
