= Italy at the 2025 Winter World University Games =

- IOC code: ITA
- NOC: Centro Universitario Sportivo Italiano
- Website: www.cusi.it

in Turin, Italy 13 January 2025 – 23 January 2025
- Competitors: 89 in 12 sports
- Medals Ranked 8th: Gold 4 Silver 5 Bronze 6 Total 15

Winter Universiade appearances (overview)
- 1960; 1962; 1964; 1966; 1968; 1972; 1978; 1981; 1983; 1985; 1987; 1989; 1991; 1993; 1995; 1997; 1999; 2001; 2003; 2005; 2007; 2009; 2011; 2013; 2015; 2017; 2019; 2023; 2025

Italy competed at the 2025 Winter World University Games in Turin, Italy, from 13 to 23 January 2025.

== Medalists ==
Medal	Name	Sport	Event	Date
Gold	Martina Vozza	Para-alpine skiing	Women's super-g VI	16 January
Gold	Martina Vozza	Para-alpine skiing	Women's giant slalom VI	18 January
Gold	Nathalie Bernard	Freestyle skiing	Women's ski cross	22 January
Gold	Elisa Fava	Snowboarding	Women's parallel slalom	22 January
Silver	Maria Eugenia Boccardi	Cross-country skiing	Women's 10 km individual free	15 January
Silver	Daniel Grassl	Figure skating	Men's single	18 January
Silver	Elisa Fava	Snowboarding	Women's parallel giant slalom	21 January
Silver	Stefano Pizzato	Alpine skiing	Men's slalom	22 January
Silver	Simon Dorfmann	Snowboarding	Men's parallel slalom	22 January
Bronze	Marika Savoldelli	Snowboarding	Women's snowboard cross	14 January
Bronze	Giulia Paolino; Andrea Tuba	Figure skating	Ice dance	17 January
Bronze	Margherita Cecere	Alpine skiing	Women's giant slalom	18 January
Bronze	Noemi Junod	Ski mountaineering	Women's vertical race	19 January
Bronze	Margherita Cecere	Alpine skiing	Women's slalom	21 January
Bronze	Fabian Lantschner	Snowboarding	Men's parallel giant slalom	21 January

== Competitors ==
At the 2025 Winter World University Games was participated 89 athletes.

Sport	Men	Women	Total
Alpine skiing	10	7	17
Biathlon	2	1	3
Cross-country skiing	4	4	8
Curling	6	5	11
Figure skating	5	5	10
Freestyle skiing	2	1	3
Para-alpine skiing	1	2	3
Para-cross-country skiing	1	0	0
Short track speed skating	4	5	9
Ski mountaineering	4	4	8
Ski orienteering	2	1	3
Snowboarding	7	3	10
Total			

Athlete	Date of birth	Sport	University	Sex
Vanessa Andreatta	7 June 2005	Short track speed skating	University of Trento	F
Greta Angelini	13 April 2003	Freestyle skiing	Aosta Valley University	F
Maria Sole Antonini	23 January 2004	Alpine skiing	University of Turin	F
Carlotta Argentieri	19 July 2003	Figure skating	University of Turin	F
Rocco Baldini	12 January 2002	Ski mountaineering	Università degli Studi Pegaso	M
Nathalie Bernard	6 May 2003	Freestyle skiing	Università degli Studi eCampus	F
Silvia Berra	30 July 2002	Ski mountaineering	Università degli Studi Pegaso	F
Margherita Betti	19 September 2005	Short track speed skating	University of Verona	F
Luca Bianchi	23 January 2004	Alpine skiing	Università Cattolica del Sacro Cuore	M
Maria Eugenia Boccardi	25 December 2000	Cross-country skiing	University of Trento	F
Giorgio Busulini	2 October 2005	Alpine skiing, Freestyle skiing	University of Rome Tor Vergata	M
Giuseppe Cantamessa	7 June 2002	Ski mountaineering	University of Turin	M
Lucrezia Casagrande	3 April 2003	Short track speed skating	University of Turin	F
Matilde Casse	6 December 2005	Alpine skiing	Università degli Studi Pegaso	F
Pietro Castellazzi	20 June 2004	Short track speed skating	Università degli Studi Pegaso	M
Margherita Cecere	5 February 2003	Alpine skiing	Polytechnic University of Turin	F
Roberta Cenci	9 March 2004	Cross-country skiing	University of Trento	F
Sebastiano Cipriano	28 December 2004	Alpine skiing	University of Padua	M
Corey Circelli	11 September 2002	Figure skating	Toronto Metropolitan University	M
Federica Cola	26 September 2004	Short track speed skating	Università degli Studi Pegaso	F
Giacomo Colli	19 October 2003	Curling	Ca' Foscari University of Venice	M
Carlo Cordone	25 December 2001	Alpine skiing	University of Alaska Anchorage	M
Tommaso Costa	24 August 2006	Snowboarding	University of Parma	M
Gabriel Curtaz	5 February 2004	Biathlon, Cross-country skiing	University of Eastern Piedmont	M
Francesco De Zanna	17 January 2002	Curling	Università degli Studi Pegaso	M
Marco De Zanna	8 September 2004	Alpine skiing	University of Trento	M
Giovanni Di Mola	8 January 2004	Snowboarding	Università degli Studi Pegaso	M
Simon Dorfmann	14 June 2004	Snowboarding	Free University of Bozen-Bolzano	M
Elisa Fava	22 January 2003	Snowboarding	University of Turin	F
Gloria Gabrielli	18 July 2004	Cross-country skiing	Università degli Studi eCampus	F
Nicolò Genovese	20 July 2005	Cross-country skiing	University of Insubria	M
Enrico Giacomelli	3 January 2002	Alpine skiing	University of Insubria	M
Andrea Giacomiello	17 March 2004	Snowboarding	University of Turin	M
Camilla Gilberti	30 September 2002	Curling	University of Verona	F
Andrea Gilli	11 January 2006	Curling	Università degli Studi Pegaso	M
Stefano Gilli	20 September 2004	Curling	Università degli Studi Pegaso	M
Lucrezia Grande	1 June 2004	Curling	University of Turin	F
Daniel Grassl	4 April 2002	Figure skating	Università degli Studi eCampus	M
Sofia Groblechner	15 December 2003	Snowboarding	Università degli Studi Pegaso	F
Lara Naki Gutmann	6 November 2002	Figure skating	University of Camerino	F
Noemi Junod	25 April 2003	Ski mountaineering	Università degli Studi Pegaso	F
Fabian Lantschner	16 March 2002	Snowboarding	Free University of Bozen-Bolzano	M
Alessandro Loreggia	27 November 2004	Short track speed skating	Università Telematica Universitas Mercatorum	M
Giovanni Lorenzetti	6 March 2003	Cross-country skiing	Università degli Studi eCampus	M
Alice Maniezzo	11 February 2005	Ski mountaineering	Università degli Studi eCampus	F
Riccardo Masiero	30 November 2001	Cross-country skiing	University of Verona	M
Anael Mezzacasa	27 May 2002	Biathlon	Università degli Studi Pegaso	F
Pietro Motterlini	6 January 2004	Alpine skiing	University of Denver	M
Giorgio Napoli	25 October 1998	Para-alpine skiing	IULM University of Milan	M
Ginevra Negrello	17 December 2004	Figure skating	University of Insubria	F
Davide Oss Chemper	7 August 2002	Short track speed skating	University of Trento	M
Giulia Paolino	3 August 2004	Figure skating	Cuyahoga Community College	F
Alessandro Picchiarelli	7 February 2004	Short track speed skating	University of Turin	M
Marina Piredda	28 September 2002	Figure skating	University of Verona	F
Stefano Pizzato	20 August 2003	Alpine skiing	Università degli Studi Niccolò Cusano	M
Eleonora Pizzi	28 April 2004	Alpine skiing	Polytechnic University of Milan	F
Cecilia Pizzinato	3 June 2004	Alpine skiing	Bocconi University	F
Federico Podda	1 March 2004	Snowboarding	Università degli Studi Pegaso	M
Anna Pradel	17 November 2001	Ski orienteering	University of Verona	F
Matteo Rezzoli	18 February 2004	Snowboarding	Università degli Studi Pegaso	M
Gabriele Rigaudo	1 June 2004	Cross-country skiing	University of Alaska Fairbanks	M
Francesco Riva	21 July 2000	Figure skating	University of Camerino	M
Nicole Riz	19 February 2004	Ski orienteering	University of Padua	F
Martina Sacchi	29 April 2003	Alpine skiing	Università degli Studi eCampus	F
Marco Salvadori	1 June 2002	Ski mountaineering	University of Brescia	M
Lorenzo Salvati	3 October 2004	Alpine skiing	Sapienza University of Rome	M
Gabriele Sartori	31 March 2001	Alpine skiing	Università degli Studi Pegaso	M
Marika Savoldelli	5 January 2003	Snowboarding	Università telematica San Raffaele	F
Davide Seppi	2 April 2002	Alpine skiing	University of Parma	M
Viola Simonini	4 March 2005	Short track speed skating	Università Telematica Universitas Mercatorum	F
Maddalena Somà	1 January 2001	Cross-country skiing	University of Verona	F
Stefano Spiller	3 July 2005	Curling	Polytechnic University of Turin	M
Leonardo Taufer	26 August 2004	Ski mountaineering	University of Trento	M
Andrea Tuba	24 May 2003	Figure skating	Università degli Studi Pegaso	M
Filippo Uber	28 September 2004	Para-cross-country skiing	University of Trento	M
Giulia Valleriani	21 October 2004	Alpine skiing	Università degli Studi Niccolò Cusano	F
Clizia Vallet	22 November 2004	Ski mountaineering	Aosta Valley University	F
Francesco Vigliani	15 July 2005	Curling	University of Turin	M
Martina Vozza	3 April 2004	Para-alpine skiing	Università degli Studi Pegaso	F
Giada Zambelli	19 November 2005	Curling	University of Florence	F
Giulia Zardini	29 January 2003	Curling	Università Telematica Universitas Mercatorum	F
Raffaele Zich	23 June 2006	Figure skating	University of Turin	M
