= List of largest universities and university networks by enrollment =

Statistics of Universities in terms of enrollment

This list of largest universities by enrollment in the world includes total active enrollment across all campuses and off-campus study. The enrollment numbers listed are the sum of undergraduate and postgraduate students in active enrollment. The universities included below confer degrees of bachelor-level or higher and either share a central board of governance and a single chancellor or president or confer degrees with the same institution name.

== Largest university networks ==
Many of these universities, especially those in the United States, are systems of individual campuses and may not accurately represent a comparable student body. For example, the enrollment listed for the University of California is the population of the entire student body in the University of California system, which consists of several individual campuses throughout the state. All University of California campuses are referred to as "The University of California" and then further identified by the campus location, such as "University of California, Irvine". Other states organize their public universities differently, further complicating direct comparisons.

Rank	Institution	Location	Continent	Founded	Affiliation	Distance/In-Person^{[a]}	Enrollment	Ref
1	(India) Indira Gandhi National Open University	New Delhi, India	Asia	1985	Public	Distance/In-Person	3,000,000+	
2	National University, Bangladesh	Gazipur, Bangladesh	Asia	1992	Public	In-Person	3,425,832	
3	(United States) California Community Colleges	California, United States	North America	1967	Public	In-Person/ Distance	2,241,347	
4	(Turkey) Anadolu University	Eskişehir, Turkey	Asia	1958	Public	Distance/In-Person	1,974,343	
5	(Iran) Islamic Azad University	Iran	Asia	1982	Private	In-Person	1,300,000	
6	(Pakistan) Allama Iqbal Open University	Islamabad, Pakistan	Asia	1974	Public	Distance/In-Person	1,027,000	
7	(United States) Laureate Education	International	Global	1999	Private	Distance/In-Person	875,000	
8	Bangladesh Open University	Gazipur, Bangladesh	Asia	1992	Public	Distance	650,000	
9	Indonesia Open University	Jakarta, Indonesia	Asia	1984	Public	Distance	646,467	
10	National Technological Institute of Mexico	Mexico	North America	1948 and 2014	Public	In-Person	620,000 (2019)	
11	(India) Savitribai Phule Pune University	Pune, India	Asia	1948	Public	In-Person	665,000	
12	(India) Chaudhary Charan Singh University	Meerut, India	Asia	1965	Public	In-Person	560,000	
13	(India) University of Mumbai	Mumbai, India	Asia	1857	Public	In-Person	549,432	
14	(Thailand) Ramkhamhaeng University	Bangkok, Thailand	Asia	1971	Public	In-Person	525,000	
15	National Open University of Nigeria	Nigeria	Africa	2002	Public	Distance	515,000	
16	(Nepal) Tribhuvan University	Kirtipur, Nepal	Asia	1959	Public	In-Person	499,671	
17	(United States) California State University	California, United States	North America	1857	Public	In-Person	457,992	
18	(Pakistan) University of the Punjab	Lahore, Pakistan	Asia	1882	Public	In-Person	450,000	
19	(India) Dr. B.R. Ambedkar Open University	Hyderabad,India	Asia	1982	Public	Distance	450,000	
20	(United States) State University System of Florida	Florida, United States	North America	1954	Public	In-Person	430,000	
21	(United States) University System of Ohio	Ohio, United States	North America	2007	Public	In-Person	429,310	
22	(India) Delhi University	Delhi, India	Asia	1922	Public	In-Person/Distance	700,000	
23	(Iran) Payame Noor University	Iran	Asia	1987	Public	Distance/In-Person	400,000	
24	(India) Sikkim Manipal University	Sikkim, India	Asia	1995	Private	In-Person	390,000	
25	University of South Africa	Pretoria, South Africa	Africa	1873	Public	Distance	370,000	
26	(United States) State University of New York	New York, United States	North America	1948	Public	In-Person	363,612	
27	National Autonomous University of Mexico	Mexico City, Mexico	North America	1551	Public	In-Person	356,530	
28	(France) National Centre for Distance Education	France	Europe	1939	Public	Distance	350,000	
29	(United States) University System of Georgia	Georgia, United States	North America	1931	Public	In-Person	318,027	
30	(Argentina) University of Buenos Aires	Buenos Aires, Argentina	South America	1821	Public	In-Person	316,050	
30	(United States) Minnesota State Colleges and Universities system	Minnesota, United States	North America	1995	Public	In-Person	300,000	
31	(India) Osmania University	Hyderabad, India	Asia	1918	Public	In-Person	300,000	
32	(United States) University of the People	California, United States	North America	2009	Private	Distance	271,095	
33	(Spain) National University of Distance Education	Spain	Europe	1972	Public	Distance/In-Person	260,079	
34	(India) Rajiv Gandhi Proudyogiki Vishwavidyalaya	Bhopal, Madhya Pradesh, India	Asia	1998	Public	In-Person	260,000	
35	(Egypt) Cairo University	Giza, Egypt	Africa	1908	Public	In-Person	257,200	
36	(United States) University of California system	California, United States	North America	1869	Public	In-Person	256,000	
37	(United States) City University of New York	New York, United States	North America	1961	Public	In-Person	243,000	
38	(United States) University of North Carolina system	North Carolina, United States	North America	1789	Public	In-Person	242,000	
39	(United States) University of Texas System	Texas, United States	North America	1881	Public	In-Person	221,337	
40	(Brazil) Estácio de Sá University	Rio de Janeiro, Brazil	South America	1970	Private	In-Person	215,000	
41	(Mexico) University of Guadalajara	Guadalajara, Mexico	North America	1791	Public	In-Person	209,406	
42	(Mexico) Autonomous University of Nuevo León	Monterrey, Mexico	North America	1933	Public	In-Person	206,000	
43	(United Kingdom) Open University	Milton Keynes, United Kingdom	Europe	1969	Public	Distance/In-Person	205,420	
44	(Iran) University of Applied Science and Technology	Iran	Asia	1992	Public	In-Person	200,000	
45	(United States) Technical College System of Georgia	Georgia, United States	North America	1970	Public	In-Person	191,567	
46	(United States) Utah System of Higher Education	Utah, United States	North America	1894	Public	In-Person	189,351	
47	(Russia) Russian Presidential Academy of National Economy and Public Administration	Moscow, Russia	Europe	1977	Public	In-Person	180,000	
48	(Saudi Arabia) King Abdulaziz University	Jeddah, Saudi Arabia	Asia	1976	Public	In-Person	177,234	
49	(Iran) National University of Skill	Iran	Asia	1965	Public	In-Person	175,000	
50	(Mexico) Instituto Politécnico Nacional	Mexico City, Mexico	North America	1936	Public	In-Person	171,581	
51	(Dominican Republic) Universidad Autónoma de Santo Domingo	Santo Domingo	North America	1538 (reopened 1914)	Public	In-Person	170,530	
52	(Egypt) Ain Shams University	Cairo, Egypt	Africa	1950	Public	In-Person	170,000 (Undergraduates Only)	
53	(United Kingdom) University of London	London, United Kingdom	Europe	1836	Public	In-Person	170,000	
54	(United States) Southern New Hampshire University	New Hampshire, United States	North America	1932	Private	Distance/In-Person	170,000	
55	(United States) Illinois Board of Higher Education	Illinois, United States	North America	1862	Public	In-Person	163,786	
56	(United States) University of Wisconsin System	Wisconsin, United States	North America	1848	Public	In-Person	164,431	
57	(Malaysia) Universiti Teknologi MARA	Shah Alam, Malaysia	Asia	1956	Public	In-Person	160,957	
58	(South Korea) Korea National Open University	South Korea	Asia	1972	Public	Distance/In-Person	151,413	
59	(India) Dr. A. P. J. Abdul Kalam Technical University	Lucknow, India	Asia	2000	Public	In-Person	150,000	
60	(India) Madhya Pradesh Bhoj Open University	Bhopal, India	Asia	1991	Public	Distance	150,000	
61	(Italy) Sapienza University of Rome	Rome, Italy	Europe	1303	Public	In-Person	147,000	
62	(United States) University System of Maryland	Maryland, United States	North America	1988	Public	In-Person	144,363	
63	(Uruguay) University of the Republic	Montevideo, Uruguay	South America	1849	Public	In-Person	144,108	
64	(Brazil) Universidade Norte do Paraná	Londrina, Brazil	South America	1972	Private	Distance/In-Person	130,000	
65	(Germany) IU International University of Applied Sciences	Erfurt, Germany	Europe	1998	Private	Distance/In-Person	130,000	
66	Universidad de San Carlos de Guatemala	Guatemala City, Guatemala	North America	1676	Public	In-Person	124,000	
67	(France) University of Lyon	Lyon, France	Europe	2007	Public	In-Person	120,000	
68	(Colombia) UNIMINUTO system	Colombia	South America	1990	Private	Distance/In-Person	116,782	
69	(United States) Texas A&M University System	Texas, United States	North America	1876	Public	In-Person	114,691	
70	(Argentina) National University of Córdoba	Córdoba, Argentina	South America	1613	Public	In-Person	113,558	
71	(United States) Pennsylvania State System of Higher Education	Pennsylvania, United States	North America	1982	Public	In-Person	110,428	
72	(United States) Liberty University	Virginia, United States	North America	1971	Private	Distance/In-Person	110,000	
73	(France) University of Toulouse	Toulouse, France	Europe	1229	Public	In-Person	110,000	
74	(Canada) Université du Québec	Quebec, Canada	North America	1968	Public	In-Person/Distance	101,915	
75	(Iran) Farhangian University	Iran	Asia	2012	Public	In-Person	100,000	
76	Virtual University of Pakistan	Lahore, Islamabad, Pakistan	Asia	2002	Public	Distance	100,000	
77	Vietnam National University, Ho Chi Minh City	Ho Chi Minh City, Vietnam	Asia	1995	Public	In-Person	98,648	
78	(Serbia) University of Belgrade	Belgrade, Serbia	Europe	1808	Public	In-Person	97,696	
79	(Austria) University of Vienna	Vienna, Austria	Europe	1365	Public	In-Person	91,715	
80	(Mexico) Monterrey Institute of Technology and Higher Education	Monterrey, Mexico	North America	1943	Private	In-Person	91,200	
81	(Greece) Aristotle University of Thessaloniki	Thessaloniki, Greece	Europe	1925	Public	In-Person	88,283	
82	Polytechnic University of the Philippines	Philippines	Asia	1904	Public	Distance/In-Person	83,328	
83	(Spain) Complutense University of Madrid	Madrid, Spain	Europe	1293	Public	In-Person	83,000	
84	(France) Aix-Marseille University	Marseille, France	Europe	1409	Public	In-Person	80,000	
85	(Germany) University of Hagen	Hagen, Germany	Europe	1974	Public	Distance	69,982	
86	(Canada) Université de Montréal	Canada	North America	1878	Public	Distance/In-Person	67,109	
87	University of the Philippines	Philippines	Asia	1908	Public	Distance/In-Person	64,144	
88	(Iran) Academic Center for Education, Culture and Research	Iran	Asia	1980	Private	In-Person	60,000	

^{a} Indicates if most or all students are enrolled in a fully Distance Learning modality

== Individual universities ranked by European Higher Education Sector Observatory ==
The list includes the most enrolled institutions in the 2021–22 academic year from over 2,300 universities collaborating with the European Education and Culture Executive Agency of the European Union. Three types of classifications for institutions are used: public university, private government-funding dependent university (receiving over 50% of funding from government agencies or having publicly paid personnel) and private university.

Rank	Institution		Founded	Classification	Enrollment (2021–22)
Rank	C.	University	Founded	Classification	Enrollment (2021–22)
1	(Turkey)	Anadolu University	1958	Public	1,144,418
2	(Turkey)	Istanbul University	1453	Public	391,744
3	(Mexico)	National Autonomous University of Mexico	1551	Public	337,763
4	(Argentina)	University of Buenos Aires	1821	Public	308,748
5	(Egypt)	Cairo University	1908	Public	280,000
6	(Mexico)	Autonomous University of Nuevo León	1933	Public	211,775
7	(India)	Delhi University	1922	Public	184,668
8	(Egypt)	Ain Shams University	1950	Public	180,000
9	(Egypt)	Alexandria University	1942	Public	158,701
10	(Mexico)	Instituto Politécnico Nacional	1936	Public	149,409
11	(Spain)	National University of Distance Education	1972	Public	138,424
12	(Mexico)	University of Guadalajara	1791	Public	135,662
13	(United Kingdom)	Open University	1969	Private (dep.)	128,935
14	(Italy)	Sapienza University of Rome	1303	Public	109,090
15	(Egypt)	Mansoura University	1972	Public	103,361
16	(China)	South China University of Technology	1918	Public	101,999
17	(Serbia)	University of Belgrade	1808	Public	94,737
18	(Argentina)	National University of La Plata	1897	Public	91,135
19	(Morocco)	Mohammed V University	1957	Public	88,405
20	(Australia)	Monash University	1958	Public	86,693
21	(Italy)	University of Bologna	1088	Public	83,551
22	(Canada)	University of Toronto	1827	Public	83,012
23	(China)	Sun Yat-sen University	1924	Public	82,384
24	(Brazil)	University of São Paulo	1934	Public	81,663
25	(Austria)	University of Vienna	1365	Public	80,884
26	(United States)	University of Central Florida	1963	Public	80,847
27	(Italy)	University of Turin	1404	Public	80,361
28	(Greece)	University of the Aegean	1984	Public	78,527
29	(Japan)	Nihon University	1889	Private (ind.)	77,651
30	(Kazakhstan)	Suleyman Demirel University	1996	Private (ind.)	77,219
31	(Italy)	University of Naples Federico II	1224	Public	77,032
32	(United States)	Arizona State University	1885	Public	74,109
33	(Morocco)	Ibn Tofail University	1989	Public	73,658
34	(United States)	Florida International University	1965	Public	73,573
35	(United States)	Texas A&M University	1876	Public	73,267
36	(Turkey)	Ankara University	1946	Public	73,152
37	(France)	University of Lille	2018	Public	73,042
38	(Turkey)	Marmara University	1883	Public	72,721
39	(Australia)	Royal Melbourne Institute of Technology	1992	Public	72,548
40	(France)	Aix-Marseille University	1409	Public	72,468
41	(Turkey)	Kocaeli University	1992	Public	70,881
42	(Australia)	University of Melbourne	1853	Public	70,506
43	(Turkey)	Dokuz Eylül University	1982	Public	70,161
44	(Australia)	University of Sydney	1850	Public	69,834
45	(China)	Jilin University	1946	Public	68,000
46	(Turkey)	Bursa Uludağ University	1975	Public	67,748
47	(Thailand)	Kasetsart University	1943	Public	67,645
48	(Croatia)	University of Zagreb	1669	Public	67,027
49	(United States)	Ohio State University	1870	Public	66,071
50	(France)	University of Lorraine	2012	Public	65,870
51	(China)	Nanchang University	1940	Public	65,703
52	(Spain)	Complutense University of Madrid	1822	Public	64,154
53	(Australia)	University of New South Wales	1949	Public	63,864
54	(Greece)	National and Kapodistrian University of Athens	1837	Private (ind.)	63,107
55	(United States)	University of Minnesota	1854	Public	63,102
56	(Italy)	University of Milan	1600	Public	62,850
57	(Turkey)	Selçuk University	1975	Public	62,556
58	(South Africa)	University of Pretoria	1908	Public	62,500
59	(Australia)	Deakin University	1974	Public	62,041
60	(Canada)	University of British Columbia	1908	Public	61,547
61	(Spain)	Open University of Catalonia	1995	Private (ind.)	61,249
62	(United States)	University of Texas at Arlington	1895	Public	60,983
63	(Brazil)	Federal University of Rio de Janeiro	1920	Public	60,789
64	(China)	Shandong University	1901	Public	60,000
65	(China)	Wuhan University	1893	Public	60,000
66	(Italy)	University of Padua	1222	Public	58,625
67	(United States)	New York University	1831	Private (ind.)	58,271
68	(United States)	University of South Florida	1956	Public	57,498
69	(Spain)	University of Seville	1505	Public	57,360
70	(France)	Grenoble Alpes University	1970	Public	57,207
71	(United States)	University of Illinois Urbana-Champaign	1867	Public	56,544
72	(United States)	University of Washington	1861	Public	56,474
73	(China)	Nanjing University	1902	Public	56,068
74	(France)	Paris Cité University	2019	Public	56,018
75	(China)	Huazhong University of Science and Technology	1953	Public	55,638
76	(United States)	University of Florida	1853	Public	55,598
77	(Italy)	Università degli Studi Pegaso	2006	Private (ind.)	55,400
78	(Turkey)	Ege University	1955	Public	55,399
79	(United States)	Michigan State University	1855	Public	55,381
80	(Italy)	University of Florence	1321	Public	55,111
81	(United States)	University of Texas at Austin	1883	Public	54,538

== See also ==
- List of largest universities in the world by country
- List of United States universities by undergraduate enrollment
- List of the largest United States colleges and universities by enrollment
- List of United States public university campuses by enrollment
- List of universities in the United Kingdom by enrollment
