= Rita Atria =

Italian Mafia witness and investigation collaborator

- Rita Atria
- Born: 4 September 1974; Partanna, Sicily, Italy
- Died: 26 July 1992 (aged 17); Rome, Italy
- Cause of death: Suicide after the murder of her protector Paolo Borsellino
- Known for: Government witness against the Sicilian Mafia
- Relatives: Piera Aiello (sister-in-law)

Rita Atria (Italian pronunciation: [ˈriːta ˈaːtrja]; September 4, 1974 − July 26, 1992) was a witness and key collaborator in a major Mafia investigation in Sicily. She died by suicide in July 1992, a week after Cosa Nostra killed prosecutor Paolo Borsellino, with whom she had been working.

== Family background ==
Rita was born into a Mafia family in Partanna, Sicily. In 1985, at the age of 11, she lost her father, Vito, a shepherd, who was shot dead by a hit man from a rival Mafia family. Her brother, Nicola, vowed to avenge his father and probably knew the identity of the person who had killed him.

After her father's death, Rita became closer to her brother and his wife, Piera Aiello. Since her brother was also a Mafioso, Rita was privy to detailed information on the doings of the Mafia in Partanna. At some point, she also dated a boy who also had a role in the criminal underworld. In June 1991, the Mafia killed Nicola Atria. A month later her brother’s widow, Piera Aiello, went to the police and told them what she knew, thus initiating her collaboration with the judicial authorities.

== Anti-mafia testimony ==
In November 1991, at the age of 17, Rita decided to follow in her sister-in-law's footsteps, hoping to obtain justice for these murders from the legal system. The first person she gave her testimony to was magistrate Paolo Borsellino, who took her under his wing much like a paternal figure. She gave Borsellino the names of bosses in the most powerful families and disclosed information about the war between the Mafia families of Partanna, in which 30 people died. She also disclosed the names of the men who had killed her father and brother.

Rita’s mother had Rita leave the family house when she found out that her daughter was collaborating with the police. She would not care that her daughter was trying to bring her own son's killer to justice; in her opinion – and the deep-rooted Mafia culture she belonged to – the police were on the wrong side of the law. Rita was then moved into a safe house under witness protection, an apartment on the seventh floor of a building in the outskirts of Rome, where the only people she knew were her police guards. Borsellino became the only person she trusted and relied on.

The evidence provided by Rita and Piera, together with further testimony, led to the arrest of various Mafiosi and to the launch of an enquiry on politician Vincenzo Culicchia, who at the time had been mayor of Partanna for thirty years. Information obtained from Rosalba Triolo, a woman from the rival Mafia factions in Partanna, independently confirmed the testimonies of Rita and Piera to be accurate.

== Suicide ==
After losing all kind of support and understanding from friends and family, both Rita and Piera Aiello turned to Borsellino for emotional support. They referred to him as "Uncle Paolo" and called him whenever they needed him. In turn, he visited them whenever he was in Rome, even after their collaboration had ended. Borsellino used to pinch Rita on the cheek and poked fun at her tough, street-wise behavior, calling her a "mafiosa with a skirt."

On July 19, 1992, Borsellino was killed when a car bomb exploded on Via D'Amelio. The assassination took place less than two months after colleague Giovanni Falcone was also killed by Cosa Nostra near Capaci. Rita wrote in her diary: "You have died for what you believed in, but without you, I too am dead." A week later on July 26, Rita locked herself in her apartment and wrote a note which read: "I am devastated by the killing of Judge Borsellino. Now there's no one to protect me, I'm scared, and I can't take it any more." Shortly after, she killed herself by jumping out the window.

== Legacy ==
Many people regard Rita as a heroine because of her willingness to sacrifice everything, including the affection of her mother (who after her daughter's death destroyed her tombstone with a hammer) in order to pursue justice. She grew from a desire for revenge for her losses to one for justice. Like Piera, Rita was not a former Mafia criminal turned informant (pentito), and she could not be designated as a “pentito”. Because of this, she is referred to as a "collaboratore di giustizia" (someone who collaborates with prosecutors from the vantage point of being close to members of a criminal organization), a title that has been legally recognised in Italy by the law of 13/2/2001 n. 45.

Rita wrote in her diary: "Before fighting the Mafia you must first examine your own conscience, and only after defeating the Mafia inside yourself can you fight the Mafia that's in your circle of friends. We ourselves and our wrong way of behaving is the Mafia."

On July 25, 2008, Piera Aiello was nominated president of the anti-mafia association "Rita Atria".

== Film ==
Rita’s story was the subject of a 1997 documentary, One Girl Against the Mafia: Diary of a Sicilian Rebel ("Diario di una siciliana ribelle"), directed by Marco Amenta.

In 2007, Amenta reworked the documentary into the film The Sicilian Girl ("La siciliana ribelle") with Veronica D'Agostino as Rita. Rita's family has condemned the film. Rita’s niece, Vita Maria Atria, and the Rita Atria Anti-Mafia Association, complained that faces and voices in the 1997 documentary were not sufficiently altered as agreed, endangering her and her mother. In addition Amenta had not returned family footage "entrusted to him in good faith" for the documentary, according to Rita's niece. Vita Maria Atria, who has been in hiding since 1992, said she was tired of "seeing speculation about her aunt's memory." She said: "I don't believe that any of this helps to commemorate my aunt, but only serves economic ends which I really do not consider appropriate."

== See also ==
- List of victims of the Sicilian Mafia
