= Piera Aiello =

Italian police informant and politician (born 1967)

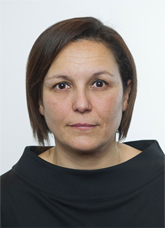

Member of the Chamber of Deputies
- Incumbent
- Assumed office 23 March 2018
- Constituency: Marsala

Personal details
- Born: 2 July 1967 (age 59) Partanna, Italy
- Party: M5S (2018–2020)
- Spouse: Nicola Atria (m. 1985; died 1991)
- Relatives: Rita Atria (sister-in-law)
- Education: Università degli Studi eCampus

Piera Aiello (Italian pronunciation: [ˈpjɛːra aˈjɛllo]; born 2 July 1967) is an Italian police informant and politician known for her stand against the Mafia. She was elected to the Chamber of Deputies. In 2019, she was named as one of the BBC's 100 Women.

== Biography ==
=== Anti-mafia testimony ===
Aiello was born in Partanna, Sicily, in 1967. In 1985, whilst in her teens she was forced to marry the son of a mafia boss, Nicola Atria. Her father-in-law, Vito Atria was killed nine days after they married. She did not love her husband and took the pill to avoid giving birth to a child. Her husband found out and raped her. Her husband was killed in 1991 and she and her three-year-old daughter witnessed the killing. She decided to name her husband's killers, a decision supported by her sister-in-law Rita Atria and antimafia magistrate Paolo Borsellino. The judge was later killed in the Via D'Amelio bombing on 19 July 1992, less than two months after his colleague Giovanni Falcone had been killed.

Aiello felt abandoned by her sister and her magistrate and she took on another identity to protect herself and her family from the mafia's retribution. The evidence given by Rita Atria and Piera, together with other testimony, led to the arrest of various Mafia members and to an enquiry into the politician Vincenzo Culicchia, who had been mayor of Partanna for thirty years.

She married again in 2000 and her husband was aware of her background. She would occasionally give talks about her story for the police to schools, but her face and name were always disguised. Eventually her teenage daughter found paintings she had made in her attic that were signed with her abandoned name. She told her daughter the whole story and decided that she needed to be more active. She decided to take up an offer by the Five Star Movement to run for political office encouraged by her daughter.

=== Member of Parliament ===
When she stood for election to the Chamber of Deputies for the Five Star Movement, because of threats from the mafia, she wore a veil to protect her identity. She was surprised that, despite hiding her face, she was elected by an area in Sicily known for being dominated by the mafia. Once she was elected, then only known as the "ghost lady", she revealed her face on 13 June 2018 and stood by her beliefs. She is now an advocate for people who inform on the Mafia hoping to protect them and their families.

In 2019, she was named as one of the BBC's 100 Women.

In 2021, during her mandate as Deputy, she graduated in political sciences at Università degli Studi eCampus with a final dissertation (« tesi di laurea ») in private law.

== Studies ==
She graduated in 2021 in political sciences at the Università degli Studi eCampus
