= List of universities in Italy =

This is the list of universities in Italy, sorted in ascending order by the name of the city where they are situated. Pontifical universities in Rome are not included in this list.

== List of universities ==
Classification by number of students
major (>40,000)
large (>20,000)
medium (>10,000)
small (<10,000) or unknown

The symbol * denote online universities.

Name	Original name	Headquarters	Public/private	Students	Est.
Marche Polytechnic University	Università Politecnica delle Marche	Ancona	public	15,861	1959
University of Aosta Valley	Università della Valle D'Aosta	Aosta	private	1,239	2000
University of Bari	Università degli Studi di Bari	Bari	public	51,167	1925
Polytechnic University of Bari	Politecnico di Bari	Bari	public	10,101	1990
University of Sannio	Università del Sannio di Benevento	Benevento	public	6,320	1998
Giustino Fortunato University*	Università degli Studi Giustino Fortunato	Benevento	private	700	2006
University of Bergamo	Università degli Studi di Bergamo	Bergamo	public	15,198	1968
University of Bologna	Alma Mater Studiorum - Università di Bologna	Bologna	public	77,691	1088
Free University of Bozen-Bolzano	Libera Università di Bolzano/Freie Universität Bozen	Bolzano	private	2,812	1997
University of Gastronomic Sciences	Università degli Studi di Scienze Gastronomiche	Bra	private	260	2004
University of Brescia	Università degli Studi di Brescia	Brescia	public	14,466	1982
University of Cagliari	Università degli Studi di Cagliari	Cagliari	public	28,415	1606
University of Camerino	Università di Camerino	Camerino	public	6,876	1336
University of Molise	Università degli Studi del Molise	Campobasso	public	7,735	1982
Libera Università Mediterranea	Libera Università Mediterranea Jean Monnet di Casamassima (LUM) — Università LUM	Casamassima	private	1,315	1995
University of Campania Luigi Vanvitelli	Università degli Studi della Campania Luigi Vanvitelli	Caserta	public	27,644	1991
University of Cassino	Università degli Studi di Cassino	Cassino	public	8,990	1979
University Carlo Cattaneo	Libera Università "Carlo Cattaneo" - LIUC	Castellanza	private	1,786	1991
University of Catania	Università degli Studi di Catania	Catania	public	50,080	1434
Magna Græcia University of Catanzaro	Università degli Studi "Magna Graecia" di Catanzaro	Catanzaro	public	9,484	1998
D'Annunzio University of Chieti–Pescara	Università degli Studi "Gabriele D'Annunzio"	Chieti, Pescara	public	29,980	1960
Kore University of Enna	Università Kore di Enna	Enna	public	6,184	1995
Faenza ISIA	Istituto Superiore per le Industrie Artistiche - ISIA di Faenza	Faenza	public	150	1973
University of Ferrara	Università degli Studi di Ferrara	Ferrara	public	15,803	1391
University of Florence	Università degli Studi di Firenze	Florence	public	50,173	1321
Italian Institute of Human Sciences (SUM)	SUM - Istituto Italiano di Scienze Umane di Firenze	Florence	public		2002
Florence ISIA	Istituto Superiore per le Industrie Artistiche - ISIA di Firenze	Florence	public	150	1973
Italian University Line*	Università telematica degli studi “IUL”	Florence	private		2005
University of Foggia	Università degli Studi di Foggia	Foggia	public	9,683	1999
University of Genoa	Università degli Studi di Genova	Genoa	public	33,659	1481
University of L'Aquila	Università degli Studi dell'Aquila	L'Aquila	public	24,276	1952
University of Salento	Università degli Studi del Salento	Lecce	public	20,110	1955
IMT School for Advanced Studies	Scuola IMT - Istituzioni, Mercati, Tecnologie - Alti Studi - Lucca	Lucca	public		2005
University of Macerata	Università degli Studi di Macerata	Macerata	public	9,837	1290
University of Messina	Università degli Studi di Messina	Messina	public	28,143	1548
University of Milan	Università degli Studi di Milano	Milan	public	60,047	1924
University of Milan - Bicocca	Università degli Studi di Milano-Bicocca	Milan	public	33,446	1998
Polytechnic University of Milan	Politecnico di Milano	Milan	public	40,833	1863
Università Cattolica del Sacro Cuore	Università Cattolica del Sacro Cuore	Milan	private	37,560	1921
Bocconi University	Università Commerciale Bocconi Milano	Milan	private	13,268	1902
IULM University of Milan	Libera Università di lingue e comunicazione IULM	Milan	private	4,258	1968
Vita-Salute San Raffaele University	Libera Università "Vita Salute S.Raffaele" Milano	Milan	private	2,082	1996
University of Modena and Reggio Emilia	Università degli Studi di Modena e Reggio Emilia	Modena, Reggio Emilia	public	19,931	1175
University of Naples Federico II	Università degli Studi di Napoli "Federico II"	Naples	public	71,779	1224
Parthenope University of Naples	Università degli Studi di Napoli "Parthenope"	Naples	public	15,895	1920
University of Naples L'Orientale	Università degli Studi di Napoli "L'Orientale"	Naples	public	10,163	1732
Suor Orsola Benincasa University of Naples	Università degli Studi Suor Orsola Benincasa - Napoli	Naples	private	8,898	1864
Pegaso University of Naples*	Università degli Studi Pegaso	Naples	private	27,887	2006
e-Campus University*	Università telematica "e-Campus"	Novedrate	private		2006
University of Padua	Università degli Studi di Padova	Padua	public	60,317	1222
University of Palermo	Università degli Studi di Palermo	Palermo	public	46,074	1806
University of Parma	Università degli Studi di Parma	Parma	public	26,540	1117
University of Pavia	Università degli Studi di Pavia	Pavia	public	21,965	1361
Institute for Advanced Study of Pavia	Istituto Universitario di Studi Superiori di Pavia	Pavia	public	350	1997
University of Perugia	Università degli Studi di Perugia	Perugia	public	24,962	1308
University for Foreigners Perugia	Università per Stranieri di Perugia	Perugia	public	1,225	1921
Humanitas University	Università Humanitas	Pieve Emanuele	private	140	2014
University of Pisa	Università degli Studi di Pisa	Pisa	public	50,114	1343
Sant'Anna School of Advanced Studies	Scuola Superiore di Studi Universitari e di Perfezionamento Sant'Anna di Pisa	Pisa	public		1987
Scuola Normale Superiore	Scuola Normale Superiore di Pisa	Pisa	public		1810
Basilicata University	Università degli Studi della Basilicata	Potenza	public	7,716	1982
University of Reggio Calabria	Università degli Studi "Mediterranea" di Reggio	Reggio Calabria	public	5,651	1968
University for Foreigners "Dante Alighieri" of Reggio Calabria	Università per Stranieri "Dante Alighieri" di Reggio Calabria	Reggio Calabria	private	691	1984
University of Calabria	Università della Calabria	Rende (CS)	public	31,724	1972
Sapienza University of Rome	Sapienza Università di Roma	Rome	public	107,507	1303
University of Rome II "Tor Vergata"	Università degli Studi di Roma "Tor Vergata"	Rome	public	31,987	1982
University of Rome III	Università degli Studi di Roma Tre	Rome	public	35,915	1992
Foro Italico University of Rome	Università degli Studi di Roma "Foro Italico"	Rome	public	2,177	1998
Rome ISIA	Istituto Superiore per le Industrie Artistiche - ISIA di Roma	Rome	public	150	1973
LUISS University of Rome	Libera Università Internazionale Studi Sociali "Guido Carli" LUISS-ROMA	Rome	private	7,853	1974
LUMSA University	Libera Università "Maria SS. Assunta" (LUMSA)	Rome	private	7,200	1939
Biomedical University of Rome	Università "Campus Bio-medico"	Rome	private	1,621	1991
European University of Rome	Università Europea di Roma	Rome	private	959	2005
University of International Studies of Rome	Università degli Studi Internazionali di Roma	Rome	private	1,432	1996
Link Campus University	Università degli studi Link Campus University	Rome	private	1,946	1999
Università degli Studi di Roma "Unitelma Sapienza"*	Unitelma Sapienza University	Rome	private		2004
UniCamillus University	St Camillus International University of Health and Medical Sciences	Rome	private		2017
Guglielmo Marconi University*	Università degli Studi Guglielmo Marconi	Rome	private	22,000	2004
Mercatorum University*	Universitas Mercatorum	Rome	private	3,859	2006
Niccolò Cusano University*	Università degli Studi Niccolò Cusano	Rome	private	11,610	2006
San Raffaele University of Rome*	Università telematica "San Raffaele"	Rome	private		2006
UniNettuno University*	Università telematica internazionale “Uninettuno”	Rome	private		2005
University of Salerno	Università degli Studi di Salerno	Salerno	public	34,619	1968
University of Sassari	Università degli Studi di Sassari	Sassari	public	13,561	1562
University of Siena	Università degli Studi di Siena	Siena	public	16,580	1240
Foreigners University of Siena	Università per Stranieri di Siena	Siena	public	984	1917
University of Teramo	Università degli Studi di Teramo	Teramo	public	6,825	1993
University Leonardo da Vinci*	Università Leonardo da Vinci	Torrevecchia Teatina	private		2004
University of Trento	Università degli Studi di Trento	Trento	public	16,682	1962
University of Trieste	Università degli Studi di Trieste	Trieste	public	16,996	1924
International School for Advanced Studies (SISSA)	SISSA – Scuola Superiore di Studi Avanzati di Trieste	Trieste	public		1978
University of Turin	Università degli Studi di Torino	Turin	public	64,457	1404
Politecnico di Torino	Politecnico di Torino	Turin	public	29,255	1859
ESCP Europe Turin Campus	ESCP Europe Torino Campus	Turin	private		2004
International University College of Turin	International University College of Turin	Turin	public		2006
University of Udine	Università degli Studi di Udine	Udine	public	15,861	1978
University of Urbino	Università degli Studi di Urbino "Carlo Bo"	Urbino	public	13,588	1506
Urbino ISIA	Istituto Superiore per le Industrie Artistiche - ISIA di Urbino	Urbino	public	150	1973
University of Insubria	Università degli Studi dell'Insubria	Varese, Como	public	8,842	1998
Ca' Foscari University of Venice	Università "Cà Foscari" di Venezia	Venice	public	18,868	1868
Iuav University of Venice	Università Iuav di Venezia	Venice	public	5,016	1926
Salesian University Institute of Venice (IUSVE)	Istituto Universitario Salesiano Venezia (IUSVE)	Venice, Verona	private	1,942	1990
University of Eastern Piedmont	Università degli Studi del Piemonte Orientale "Amedeo Avogadro" - Vercelli	Vercelli	public	9,937	1998
University of Verona	Università degli Studi di Verona	Verona	public	22,645	1982
Tuscia University	Università degli Studi della Tuscia	Viterbo	public	7,336	1979

Source: MIUR, Anagrafe Nazionale Studenti (Academic year 2012/2013), MIUR, Università telematiche (Telematic Universities, update 08-February-2023)

== Regional distribution ==
Region	Students	%	Males	Females	Number of public universities	Population	Density (Pop. / Univ.)	Density (students per 1000 people)
Abruzzo	63591	3.61%	25527	38064	3	1338898	446299	47.50
Aosta Valley	1422	0.08%	390	1032	0	127065	NA	11.19
Apulia	97321	5.52%	38260	59061	4	4084035	1021009	23.83
Basilicata	9280	0.53%	4175	5105	1	588662	588662	15.76
Calabria	53362	3.03%	22505	30857	4	2009252	669751	26.56
Campania	196883	11.18%	83128	113755	6	5820795	970133	33.82
Emilia-Romagna	145745	8.27%	64421	81324	4	4377435	1094359	33.29
Friuli-Venezia Giulia	34301	1.95%	15467	18834	3	1234198	411399	27.79
Lazio	248039	14.08%	111831	136208	6	5690444	948407	43.59
Liguria	36303	2.06%	15763	20540	1	1615986	1615986	22.46
Lombardy	250651	14.23%	114407	136244	7	9839177	1405597	25.47
Marche	47320	2.69%	20746	26574	4	1552968	388242	30.47
Molise	9154	0.52%	3951	5203	1	320229	320229	28.59
Piedmont	99582	5.65%	47013	52569	3	4449185	1483062	22.38
Sardinia	44769	2.54%	16864	27905	3	1672511	557504	26.77
Sicily	143474	8.14%	56496	86978	3	5042992	1680997	28.45
Trentino-Alto Adige	21008	1.19%	9175	11833	1	1021857	1021857	20.56
Tuscany	121463	6.90%	53409	68054	4	3730130	932533	32.56
Umbria	29119	1.65%	12681	16438	2	902138	451069	32.28
Veneto	108786	6.18%	44847	63939	4	4916197	1229049	22.13
Italy	1761573	100.00%	761056	1000517	64	60380912	928937	29.17

Source: MIUR, Anagrafe Nazionale Studenti (Academic year 2010/2011)

== National rankings ==
=== Anvur Rankings ===
ANVUR University Rankings (2018)
Subject	#1	#2	#3
Architecture & Civil Engineering	Scuola Superiore Studi Pavia IUSS	Iuav University of Venice	University of Trento
Engineering	Sant'Anna School of Advanced Studies	Polytechnic University of Milan	Polytechnic University of Bari
Agriculture	University of Bari	University of Teramo	University of Tuscia
Biology	University of Milan	Marche Polytechnic University	University of Salento
Chemistry	Sapienza University of Rome	University of Parma	University of Naples Federico II
Earth sciences	University of Ferrara	University of Milan	University of Milan Bicocca
Literature	University of Florence	University of Udine	University of Siena
Humanities	University of Pisa	University of Verona	University of Campania
Economics & Statistics	University Ca' Foscari of Venice	University of Sassari	University of Cagliari
Physics	D'Annunzio University of Chieti–Pescara	International School for Advanced Studies	University of Turin
Jurisprudence	University of Catania	University of Palermo	Mediterranea University of Reggio Calabria
Sociology & Political sciences	University of Trento	University of Milan	University of Bologna
Medical sciences	University of Milan Bicocca	University of Genoa	University of Trieste
Mathematics	University of Rome Tor Vergata	Polytechnic University of Turin	Scuola Normale Superiore di Pisa

=== Censis Rankings ===
La Repubblica-CENSIS University Rankings (2017)
Subject	#1	#2	#3
Formal sciences & Physics	Polytechnic University of Turin	University of Trieste	University of Camerino
Chemistry	University of Siena	University of Pavia	University of Genoa
Earth sciences & Life sciences	University of Camerino	University of Pavia	University of Padua
Sociology & Political sciences	University of Bologna	University of Trieste	University of Pavia
Jurisprudence	University of Trento	University of Modena and Reggio Emilia	University of Bologna
Humanities	University of Ferrara	University of Macerata	University of Bologna
Medical sciences	University of Pavia	University of Padua	University of Milan Bicocca
Engineering	University of Modena and Reggio Emilia	Polytechnic University of Milan	Polytechnic University of Turin
Linguistics	University of Trieste	University of Trento	University of Modena and Reggio Emilia
Education	Sapienza University of Rome	University of Perugia	University of Macerata
Architecture & Design	University of Sassari	Polytechnic University of Milan	University IUAV of Venice
Agriculture	University of Modena and Reggio Emilia	University of Bologna	University of Padua
Economics & Statistics	University of Padua	University of Bologna	University Ca' Foscari of Venice
Psychology	University of Padua	University of Pavia	University of Trieste

== International rankings ==
QS World University Rankings
#	Institution	2004	05	06	07	08	09	10	11	12	13	14	15	16	17	18	19	20	21	22	23	24	25	26
1	Polytechnic University of Milan	200+	200+	311	343	291	286	295	277	244	230	229	187	183	183	170	156	149	137	142	139	123	111	98
2	Sapienza University of Rome	162	125	197	183	205	205	190	210	216	196	202	213	223	223	215	217	203	171	171	171	134	132	128
3	University of Bologna	186	159	207	173	192	174	176	183	194	188	182	204	208	208	188	180	177	160	166	167	154	133	138
4	University of Padua	200+	200+	370	312	296	312	261	263	298	267	262	309	338	338	296	249	234	216	242	243	219	236	233
5	Polytechnic University of Turin	-	-	-	500+	500+	400+	450+	450+	400+	370	365	314	305	305	307	387	348	308	334	325	252	241	242
6	University of Milan	-	-	-	-	500+	500+	450+	275	256	235	238	306	370	370	325	325	302	301	316	324	276	285	276
7	University of Pisa	200+	200+	326	325	333	322	300	322	314	259	245	367	431	431	421	422	389	383	388	404	349	351	343
9	University of Rome Tor Vergata	-	-	423	416	400+	400+	400+	380	336	320	305	401	481	481	461	511	511	521	494	449	489	393	355
10	University of Naples Federico II	-	-	-	420	398	400+	400+	400+	450+	397	345	441	481	481	481	472	424	392	424	416	435	416	379
11	University of Florence	200+	199	338	329	349	377	328	360	400+	379	352	411	451	451	461	501	448	432	440	460	358	375	404

Academic Ranking of World Universities
#	Institution	World rank 2014	World rank 2017	World rank 2025
1	Sapienza University of Rome	151-200	151-200	101-150
2-4	University of Padua	151-200	151-200	151-200
2-4	University of Milan	151-200	201-300	151-200
2-4	University of Pisa	151-200	201-300	151-200
5-8	University of Bologna	151-200	201-300	201-300
5-8	University of Naples Federico II	301-400	301-400	201-300
5-8	Polytechnic University of Milan	201-300	201-300	201-300
5-8	University of Turin	151-200	201-300	201-300
9-13	University of Florence	201-300	301-400	301-400
9-13	University of Milan-Bicocca	301-400	301-400	301-400
9-13	University of Pavia	401-500	301-400	301-400
9-13	Vita-Salute San Raffaele University	-	401-500	301-400
9-13	University of Rome Tor Vergata	301-400	301-400	301-400
14	Scuola Normale Superiore di Pisa	301-400	501-600	401-500
15-16	University of Ferrara	401-500	401-500	501-600
15-16	University of Palermo	401-500	401-500	501-600
17	University of Trieste	401-500	401-500	601-700

== See also ==
- Higher education in Italy
- List of colleges and universities by country
- List of colleges and universities
- List of schools in Italy
- Open access in Italy
