= Collège français Jules-Verne (Paraguay) =

Collège français Jules-Verne is a French international school in Ciudad del Este, Paraguay. It serves levels primaire (primary school) through lycée (senior high school/sixth form college). Collège (junior high school) and lycée students use the National Centre for Distance Education (CNED) distance education programme. Preschool and elementary school are directly taught. The school was established in 2008.
