= Giorgio Margaritondo =

Swiss-American physicist

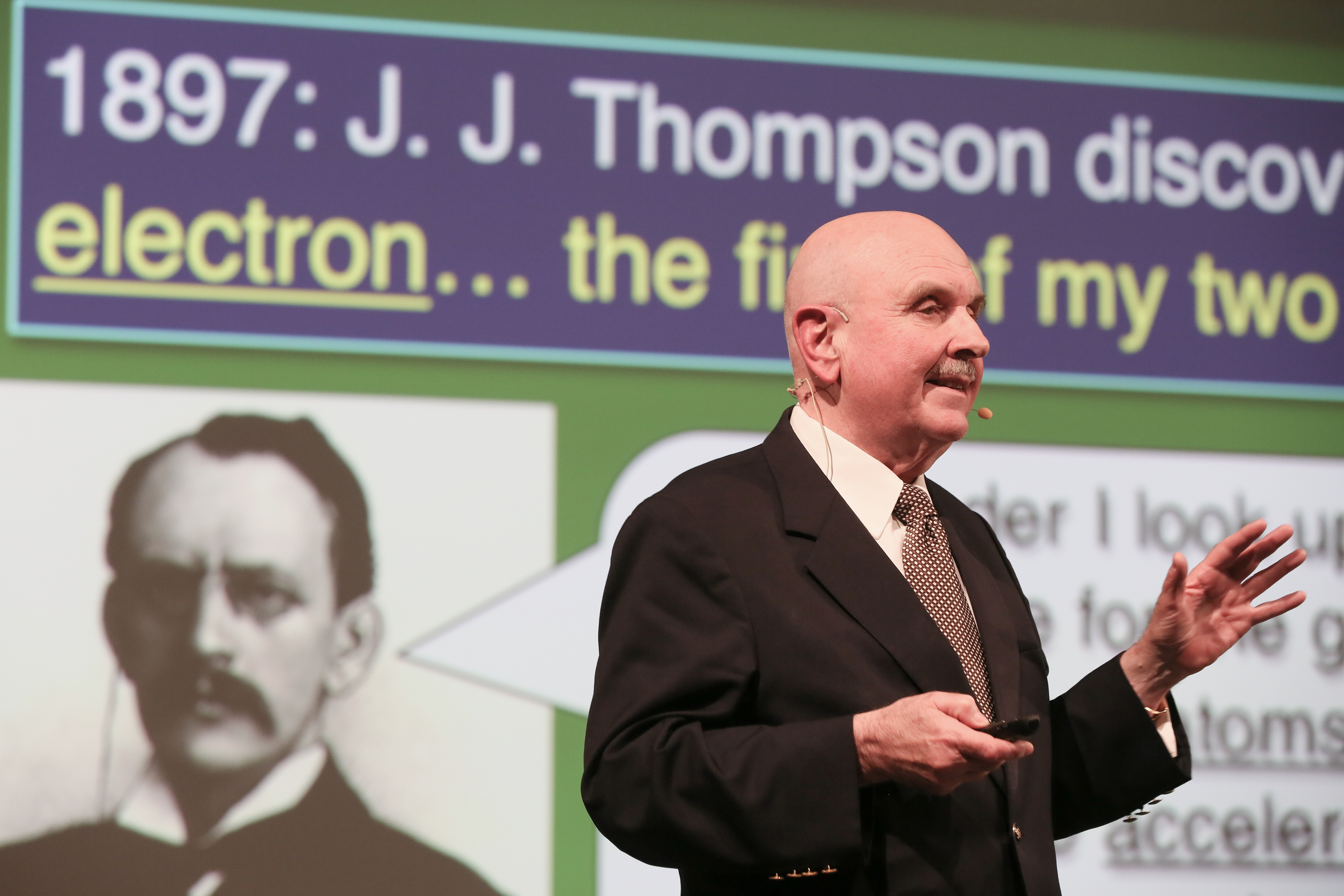
- Margaritondo during his Honorary Lecture at EPFL in 2017
- Born: August 24, 1946 (age 80); Rome, Italy
- Citizenship: Switzerland, United States
- Education: Sapienza University of Rome
- Scientific career
- Fields: Physics, synchrotron radiation
- Workplaces: École Polytechnique Fédérale de Lausanne (EPFL)
- Website: https://people.epfl.ch/giorgio.margaritondo?lang=en

Giorgio Margaritondo (born August 24, 1946 in Rome, Italy) is a Swiss and American physicist and an emeritus professor at École Polytechnique Fédérale de Lausanne (EPFL). He is known for his pioneering work in the use and dissemination of synchrotron radiation and free electron lasers.

He is currently affiliated to the Laboratory for Quantum Magnestism and leads the laboratory for Science History at EPFL.

== Career ==
Margaritondo graduated with a diploma (Laurea) in physics from the University of Rome in 1969. After being employed by the Italian National Research Council in Rome until 1975, he moved to the Bell Laboratories in the United States. In 1978, he was appointed Professor at the University of Wisconsin-Madison, where he was named Associate Director for research of the Synchrotron Radiation Center. In 1990, he was named Full Professor at the École Polytechnique Fédérale de Lausanne (EPFL), where he directed the Institute of Applied Physics and the Physics Department. He was subsequently named Dean of EPFL's School of Basic Sciences in 2001, and Provost in 2004. In 2010 he became Dean of Continuing Education at EPFL, until he retired in 2016.

He currently serves as the President of the Scientific and Technological Committee of the Italian Institute of Technology (IIT).

Margaritondo has authored more than 1000 peer-reviewed scientific publications and is the author of several books.

== Research ==
Margaritondo has been one of the pioneers in the use of synchrotron radiation and free electron lasers. He has developed and applied several of the basic techniques in this domain, including microscopy, spectroscopy (photoemission, stimulated desorption), coherent imaging. He developed original ways to present synchrotron radiation to a broad audience.

== Distinctions ==
Margaritondo was awarded with numerous prizes and rewards, such as the John Yarwood Memorial Medal of the British Vacuum Council in 1995 and the Romnes Award in 1983.

He is Fellow of the American Physical Society and of the American Vacuum Society and Fellow and Chartered Physicist of the Institute of Physics.

He has been an honorary Faculty member at the Vanderbilt University in Nashville.
