= Cucciolla =

Cucciolla is an Italian surname. Notable people with the surname include:

- Arturo Cucciolla (1948–2021), Italian architect
- Riccardo Cucciolla (1924–1999), Italian actor
