= The Sicilian Girl =

- Directed by: Marco Amenta
- Screenplay by: Marco Amenta; Sergio Donati; Gianni Romoli
- Produced by: Simonetta Amenta; Tilde Corsi; Gianni Romoli
- Music by: Pasquale Catalano
- Release dates: 29 October 2008 (Rome International Film Festival); 27 February 2009 (Italy)
- Running time: 115 minutes
- Country: Italy
- Languages: Italian, Sicilian

The Sicilian Girl (Italian: La siciliana ribelle) is a 2008 Italian film directed by Marco Amenta. The film is inspired by the story of Rita Atria, a key witness in a major Mafia investigation in Sicily.

== Synopsis ==
Beginning in 1985 in Balata, Sicily, the eleven-year-old Rita Mancuso witnessed the assassination of her beloved father Don Michele by a rival Mafia family. Six years later, her brother is killed by the Mafia as well. Determined to avenge the murders, she decides to break the code of silence and goes to an anti-Mafia prosecutor in Palermo with her detailed diaries to be used as evidence. Being forced to flee her village, she is put into witness protection and transferred to a safe house in Rome.

== Reception ==
For The Sicilian Girl, Amenta received a David di Donatello nomination for Best New Director. According to a New York Times movie review, the film is hobbled by sluggish direction by Amenta, who previously addressed Atria’s story in his 1997 documentary, One Girl Against the Mafia: Diary of a Sicilian Rebel.

Rita Atria's family have condemned the film; Atria's niece, Vita Maria Atria, said that "I don't believe that any of this helps to commemorate my aunt, but only serves economic ends which I really do not consider appropriate."

== Cast ==
- Veronica D'Agostino as Rita Mancuso
- Miriana Faja as Young Rita
- Francesco Casisa as Vito
- Carmelo Galati as Rita's brother
- Gérard Jugnot as Prosecutor
- Marcello Mazzarella as Don Michele
- Mario Pupella as Zio Salvo
- Primo Reggiani as Lorenzo
- Lorenzo Rosone as Young Vito
- Lucia Sardo as Rita's mother
