= IU International University of Applied Sciences =

Private university in Germany

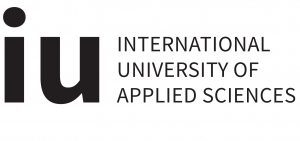
- Type: Private
- Established: 1998
- Rector: Holger Sommerfeldt
- Students: 130,000 (2025)
- Location: Erfurt, Thuringia, Germany
- Website: www.iu.de (German site) iu.org (international site)

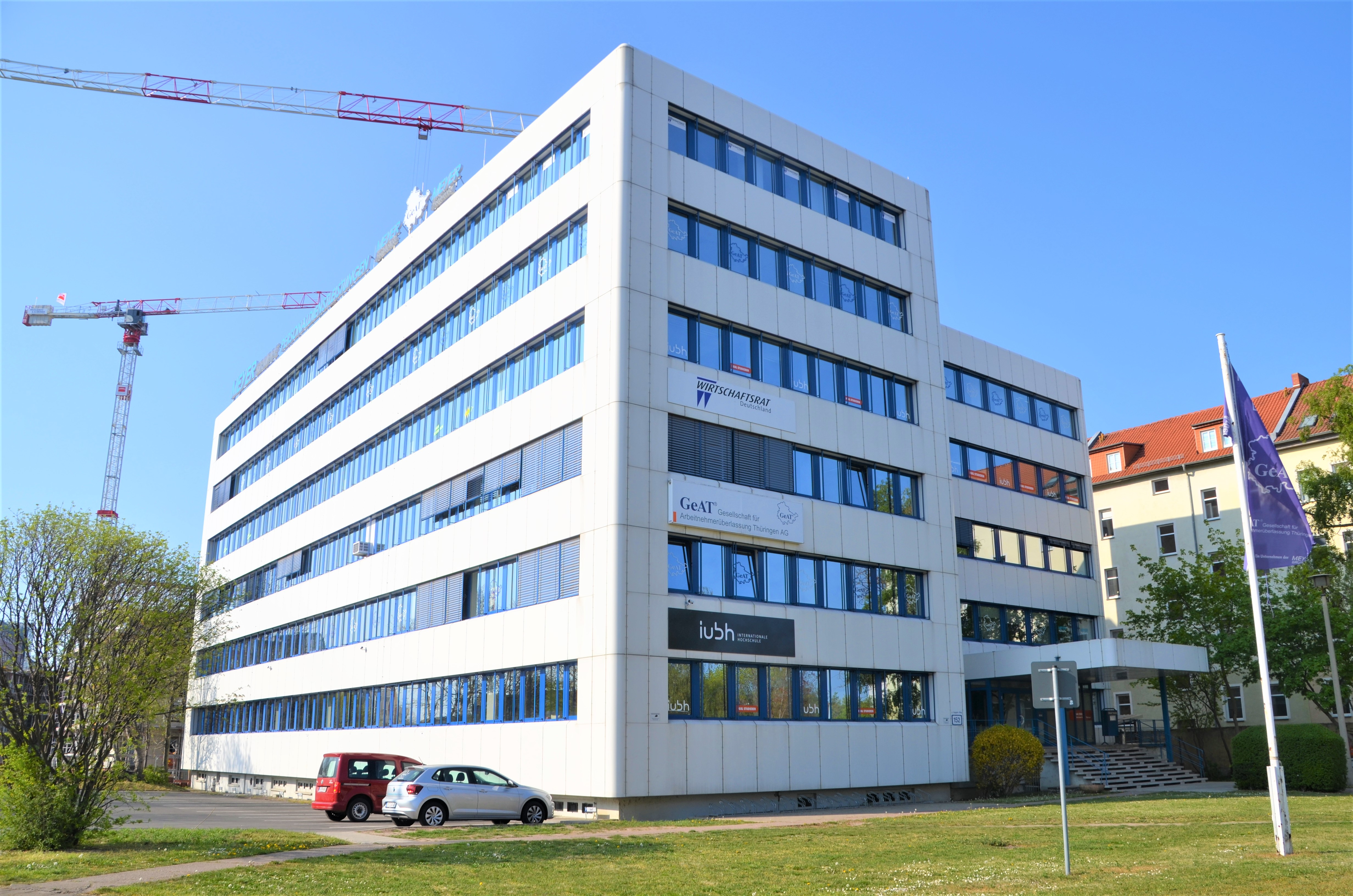
IU Campus Erfurt

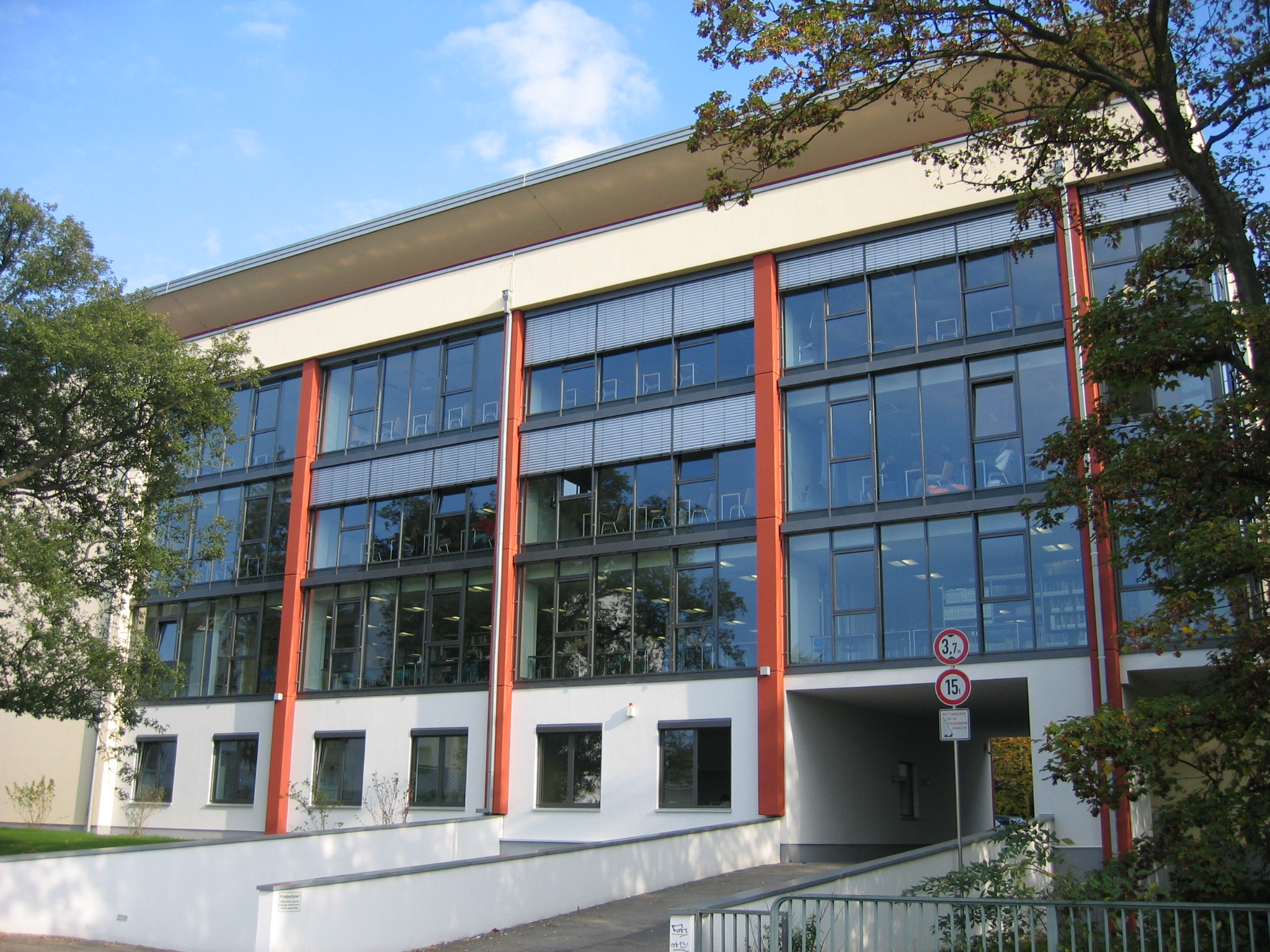
IU Campus Bad Honnef

IU International University of Applied Sciences (German: IU Internationale Hochschule) is a private for-profit university of applied sciences based in Erfurt, Germany. It opened in 2000 and was formerly known as the International University of Applied Sciences Bad Honnef / Bonn (Internationale Fachhochschule Bad Honnef/Bonn or IFH).

IU provides vocational programs in German and English, for which it offers in-person teaching on campus as well as distance or blended learning. The latter make up by far the largest part with over 80%. The university offers separate German (iu.de) and international (iu.org) programmes. With over 130,000 enrolled students, IU is the largest state-accredited university in Germany as of the summer semester of 2021 and features amongst the top 100 largest universities in the world. The university's actions have repeatedly come under criticism.

== History ==
IU was founded in 1998 as the International University of Applied Sciences Bad Honnef / Bonn (IFH), and its first intake took place in the winter semester of 2000/2001 with 23 students.

In July 2009, the German Science and Humanities Council institutionally accredited the university for ten years, followed by reaccreditation for another five years in 2021. In 2010, it became a member of the German Rectors' Conference.

In mid-2013, IU merged with Adam Ries University of Applied Sciences in Erfurt, another private university, expanding its offerings to include the dual study model. In March 2016, it merged with the University of International Business and Logistics (HIWL) in Bremen and has since started offering dual study programs at this location.

In October 2017, it was renamed to IUBH International University of Applied Sciences. In March 2021, another renaming took place to IU International University of Applied Sciences. In 2019, the registered office of the university was moved to Erfurt.

As of 2025, the university had over 4,000 employees.

== Organization ==
The university has been state-recognized since 1999 and accredited by the German Science and Humanities Council in 2009 and 2021. The study programs as well as the university's internal quality management ("system accreditation") are additionally accredited by the Foundation for International Business Administration Accreditation (FIBAA) on behalf of the German Accreditation Council.

The sponsor of the university is IU Internationale Hochschule GmbH, whose sole shareholder since 2007 has been Career Partner GmbH (since 2021: IU Group N.V.). The latter has been owned by the British investor group Oakley since 2017; previously, it was owned by the Munich-based investment firm Auctus from 2007 to 2015, and by the U.S.-based Apollo Group from 2015 to 2017.

The university's governing bodies are the rectorate, the senate, and an advisory board to represent the professional interests of the departments and companies.

== German and international programmes ==
IU targets two separate markets. In the DACH markets, with iu.de, it offers three study formats: Fernstudium (distance learning), Duales Studium (dual studies), and myStudium (a structured model combining online self-study with tutorials on campus or virtually). In the international markets, with iu.org, it offers English-taught on-campus degrees in Germany, notably in Berlin and Cologne. Since 2024-25, IU no longer offers fully online degrees to non-DACH international applicants, insteading offering on-campus studies in Germany.

IU offers vocationally oriented programmes in German and English with a mix of on-campus, distance, and blended learning formats.

== Study Programmes ==
IU International University offers more than 250 Bachelor's, Master's and MBA degree programmes in various study formats (face-to-face in-person, distance learning, combined studies, myStudies, dual studies), in the following subject areas:

- Design, Architecture & Construction
- Health
- Hospitality, Tourism & Events
- Human Resources
- IT & Technology
- Marketing & Communication
- Social Sciences
- Transportation & Logistics
- Business & Management

== Locations ==
In addition to a "virtual campus," the university currently operates 37 campus locations: Augsburg, Bad Honnef, Berlin, Bielefeld, Braunschweig, Bremen, Dortmund, Dresden, Duisburg, Düsseldorf, Erfurt, Essen, Frankfurt, Freiburg, Hamburg, Hanover, Karlsruhe, Leipzig, Lübeck, Mainz, Mannheim, Munich, Münster, Nuremberg, Peine (until the end of 2021), Stuttgart, and Ulm; locations added starting from 2022 are: Aachen, Bochum, Kassel, Kiel, Mönchengladbach, Potsdam, Ravensburg, Regensburg, Rostock, Saarbrücken, and Wuppertal.

Other locations, such as Chemnitz, Ulm and Bad Honnef have been or will close in the next years, in some instances only months after having been opened.

Examination centers for distance learning are available worldwide at every Goethe-Institut location.

== Alumni ==
See Category:IU International University of Applied Sciences alumni

- Klara Bühl
- Sara Däbritz

== Criticism ==
In 2024 and 2025, dozens of court hearings took place, after students sued the university for failing to mention that the architecture program was not professionally recognized by the German Architects Association, making it impossible for them to work as architects in Germany. As of 2026, phrases like the work possibility as an "anerkannter Architekt" (‘recognized architect’) have been deleted from the program website and a disclaimer about the missing professional recognition has been put in place. The Physician Assistant program has been discontinued in 2025, after being criticized and staying professionally unrecognized by the German Medical Association. Other programmes, such as Mechatronics, Civil Engineering, Computer Science, and Mechanical Engineering, have been discontinued weeks before being started, as a too small number of students had enrolled in the program.

There have been reports of a few hundred prospective students (primarily from India) coming to IU via the Indian start-up upGrad, paying high fees for the placement. According to a report by TAZ, students are given an impression of a traditional German campus university in advance, but once there, they found that teaching is mainly digital, with limited face-to-face teaching and little campus life. In addition, some cohorts are heavily dominated by Indian students, which makes integration difficult. In the same context, difficulties in extending residence permits are also described, as authorities check the necessity of permanent residence for programmes that are predominantly organised online.

In a Spiegel report from 2026, former employees described high pressure to achieve growth and profits through a ‘hypergrowth’ strategy pursued until 2024 leading to a lack of academic integrity, as well as a management style that was perceived as authoritarian; several compared CEO Sven Schütt to entrepreneurs such as Elon Musk. A former lecturer also describes that he did not discuss his professional qualifications with anyone during the application process, but only had a few minutes' conversation with an AI. After that, he was offered teaching assignments. ‘I have never got a job so quickly and easily in my life.’
