= List of the largest United States colleges and universities by enrollment =

The ten largest colleges and universities by enrollment in the United States.
– Private
– Public

This is a list of the largest United States colleges and universities by enrollment for colleges and universities in the United States.

What this list includes:

- Colleges and universities within the United States
- University systems if the system is run under a single administration
- Enrollment is the sum of the headcount of undergraduate and graduate students
- Enrollment is counted by the Integrated Post-secondary Education System within the United States Department of Education.
- Enrollment is the 12-month unduplicated headcount, indicating the number of unique students who attended the university during the year.

What this list does not include:

- Any indication of how many of the enrolled students are full or part-time (e.g., some universities may have a high enrollment, but have most students enrolled in only a single class)
- Any indication of how many students are online-only.

For other lists that measure university enrollment, see the see also section below.

== Rankings ==
The United States Department of Education's Integrated Post-secondary Education Data System contains information on all 6,125 officially recognized institutions of higher education in the United States. The following is a list of the ten largest institutions of higher education by Fall 2023 enrollment, meaning it is the number of unique individuals who were enrolled in at least one class on the 21st day of the Fall 2023 semester. Whether a system of individual campuses is counted as one or multiple institutions depends on how that institution is accredited and chartered. All data can be verified on the IPEDS system website. Since the Covid Pandemic, college enrollment has seen a decline.

=== 2023 ===
U.S. Department of Education Fall 2023 Enrollment
Rank	Name	Classification	Location	Enrollment
1	Western Governors University	Private	Online	185,015
2	Southern New Hampshire University	Private, Non-profit	New Hampshire	184,099
3	Grand Canyon University	Private, Non-profit	Arizona	133,000
4	Liberty University	Private	Virginia	103,068
5	University of Phoenix-Arizona	Private, For-profit	Arizona	101,150
6	Ivy Tech Community College	Public	Indiana	100,077
7	Arizona State University Campus Immersion	Public research university	Arizona	79,593
8	Texas A&M University-College Station	Public	Texas	76,633
9	Lone Star College System	Public community college	Texas	70,991
10	University of Central Florida	Public	Florida	69,233

=== 2020 ===
U.S. Department of Education Fall 2020 Enrollment
Rank	Name	Classification	Location	Enrollment
1	Western Governors University	Private	Online	147,866
2	Southern New Hampshire University	Private, Non-profit	New Hampshire	134,345
3	Grand Canyon University	Private, Non-profit	Arizona	133,000
4	Liberty University	Private	Virginia	96,709
5	The Pennsylvania State University	Public	Pennsylvania	89,816
6	University of Phoenix-Arizona	Private, For-profit	Arizona	89,763
7	Arizona State University Campus Immersion	Public research university	Arizona	74,795
8	Dallas College	Public community college	Texas	74,781
9	University of Central Florida	Public	Florida	71,881
10	Texas A&M University-College Station	Public	Texas	77,491 (as of 2023)

=== 2013 ===
U.S. Department of Education Fall 2013 Enrollment
Rank	College	Classification	Location	Enrollment
1	State University of New York System	Public	New York	606,232
2	California State University	Public	California	477,466
3	University of Phoenix	Private, For-profit	Arizona	442,033
4	University of California	Public	California	226,449
5	University of North Carolina System	Public	North Carolina	222,322
6	Ivy Tech Community College	Public	Indiana	175,313
7	Ashford University	Private, For-profit	Iowa	169,843
8	American Public University System	Private, For-profit	West Virginia	110,644
9	Liberty University	Private	Virginia	110,000
10	Miami Dade College	Public	Florida	100,855
11	Lone Star College System	Public	Texas	98,313
12	The Pennsylvania State University	Public	Pennsylvania	94,441
13	Houston Community College System	Public	Texas	93,625
14	Arizona State University	Public	Arizona	81,789
15	Kaplan University	Private, For-profit	Iowa	77,566
16	Northern Virginia Community College	Public	Virginia	76,552
17	Walden University	Private, For-profit	Minnesota	75,895
18	Tarrant County College District	Public	Texas	75,547
19	Wake Technical Community College	Public	North Carolina	74,000
20	Grand Canyon University	Private (Note: As of July 1, 2018, Grand Canyon University has transitioned from for-profit to nonprofit.)	Arizona	71,712
21	Austin Community College District	Public	Texas	70,452
22	University of Central Florida	Public	Florida	69,086
23	Ohio State University	Public	Ohio	64,930
24	University of Maryland	Public	Maryland	64,737
25	University of Minnesota	Public	Minnesota	63,929
26	Broward College	Public	Florida	62,796
27	Florida International University	Public	Florida	60,592
28	Valencia College	Public	Florida	60,469
29	University of Florida	Public	Florida	56,683
30	East Los Angeles College	Public	California	56,395
31	College of Southern Nevada	Public	Nevada	56,364
32	Rio Salado College	Public	Arizona	56,031
33	Capella University	Private, For-profit	Minnesota	56,009
34	Portland Community College	Public	Oregon	55,558

== See also ==
- List of largest universities
- List of largest universities by enrollment
- List of largest United States public university campuses by enrollment
- List of largest United States universities by undergraduate enrollment
