= List of United States university campuses by undergraduate enrollment =

The ten largest university campuses in the United States

This list of largest United States universities by undergraduate enrollment includes only individual four-year campuses, not four-year universities. Universities can have multiple campuses with a single administration.

What this list includes:

- A single Individual campus with a single physical location of a four-year public university within the United States
- Enrollment is the sum of the headcount of undergraduate students
- Enrollment is counted by the 21st-day headcount, as provided to the United States Department of Education under the Common Data Set program.
- Campuses that have small secondary physical locations that are not reported separately (for extended education, outreach, etc.) are indicated with a footnote.

What this list does not include:

- University systems, or universities that have multiple physical campuses.

For other lists that measure university enrollment, see the see also section below.

== 2018–19 enrollment ==
Ten largest public university campuses by enrollment during the 2018–19 academic year
Ranking	University	Location	Enrollment	Reference(s)
1	University of Central Florida (Note: Official main campus enrollment count includes students enrolled in several regional campuses.)	Orlando, Florida	58,913	
2	Texas A&M University	College Station, Texas	54,369	
3	Florida International University	Miami, Florida	48,439	
4	Ohio State University	Columbus, Ohio	46,820	
5	Arizona State University (Note: ASU consists of four campuses located in the same metro area; this count is for the Tempe, Arizona campus only.)	Tempe, Arizona	42,844	
6	University of Texas at Austin	Austin, Texas	40,804	
7	Pennsylvania State University	University Park, Pennsylvania	40,363	
8	Michigan State University	East Lansing, Michigan	39,423	
9	University of Florida	Gainesville, Florida	37,526	
10	University of Illinois at Urbana–Champaign	Champaign, Illinois and Urbana, Illinois	33,673	

== See also ==
- List of largest universities in the world by country
- List of largest United States universities by enrollment
- List of United States public university campuses by enrollment
