= List of United States public university campuses by enrollment =

The largest university campuses in the United States, Fall 2022

This list of largest United States public university campuses by enrollment includes only individual four-year campuses, not four-year universities. Universities can have multiple campuses with a single administration.

What this list includes:

- On-campus and in-person based class enrollment.
- Enrollment is the sum of the headcount of undergraduate and graduate students.
- Enrollment is counted by the 21st-day headcount, as provided to the United States Department of Education (USDoE) under the Common Data Set program.
- Campuses that have small secondary physical locations (<10% total enrollment) that are not reported separately to the USDoE (for extended education, outreach, etc.) are indicated with a footnote.

What this list does not include:

- University systems, or universities that have multiple physical campuses.
- Universities that are primarily online/remote.

Not all enrollment counts are directly comparable. Universities have changed how they classify and report data. See notes. For other lists that measure university enrollment, note the see also section below.

== 2025-26 enrollment ==
Ten largest public university campuses by enrollment during the 2025–26 academic year
Ranking	University	Location	Enrollments	Reference(s)
1	Texas A&M University	College Station, Texas	81,354	
2	University of Central Florida	Orlando, Florida	70,658	
3	Ohio State University	Columbus, Ohio	67,255	
4	University of Florida	Gainesville, Florida	63,148	
5	University of Illinois Urbana-Champaign	Urbana/Champaign, Illinois	60,848	
6	University of Minnesota	Minneapolis, Minnesota	57,879	
7	Purdue University	West Lafayette, Indiana	57,310	
8	Florida International University	Miami, Florida	55,673	
9	Arizona State University	Tempe, Arizona	55,468	
10	University of Texas at Austin	Austin, Texas	55,000	

== 2024–25 enrollment ==
Ten largest public university campuses by enrollment during the 2024–25 academic year
Ranking	University	Location	Enrollments	Reference(s)
1	Texas A&M University (Note: Texas A&M includes a Health Sciences Center that is generally considered part of the main campus. It is geographically separated by approximately a quarter of a mile and is between multiple sections of the same contiguous campus.)	College Station, Texas	79,114	
2	University of Central Florida	Orlando, Florida	69,818	
3	Ohio State University (Note: OSU consists of six campuses across the state of Ohio; this count is for the Columbus campus only.)	Columbus, Ohio	66,901	
4	University of Florida	Gainesville, Florida	60,795	
5	University of Illinois Urbana-Champaign	Urbana/Champaign, Illinois	59,238	
6	Purdue University	West Lafayette, Indiana	58,658	
7	University of Minnesota	Minneapolis, Minnesota	56,666	
8	Arizona State University (Note: ASU consists of four physical locations throughout Maricopa County, as well as locations in Lake Havasu, Hawaii, Los Angeles, and Washington, DC. This number includes only the Tempe campus in Maricopa County. The total in-person enrollment across campuses in Maricopa County is 79,478 as of fall 2022.)	Tempe, Arizona	56,643	
9	Florida International University	Miami, Florida	55,687	
10	University of Texas at Austin	Austin, Texas	52,384	

== 2023–24 enrollment ==
Ten largest public university campuses by enrollment during the 2023–24 academic year
Ranking	University	Location	Enrollments	Reference(s)
1	Texas A&M University	College Station, Texas	77,491	
2	University of Central Florida	Orlando, Florida	69,316	
3	University of Florida	Gainesville, Florida	60,489	
4	Ohio State University	Columbus, Ohio	60,046	
5	Arizona State University	Tempe, Arizona	57,144	
6	University of Illinois Urbana-Champaign	Urbana/Champaign, Illinois	56,403	
7	University of Minnesota	Minneapolis, Minnesota	54,890	
8	Florida International University	Miami, Florida	54,037	
9	University of Texas at Austin	Austin, Texas	53,082	
10	Michigan State University	East Lansing, Michigan	51,316	

== 2022–23 enrollment ==
Ten largest public university campuses by enrollment during the 2022–23 academic year
Ranking	University	Location	Enrollments	Reference(s)
1	Texas A&M University	College Station, Texas	74,829	
2	University of Central Florida	Orlando, Florida	68,405	
3	University of Florida	Gainesville, Florida	60,795	
4	Ohio State University	Columbus, Ohio	60,540	
5	Arizona State University	Tempe, Arizona	57,588	
6	University of Illinois Urbana-Champaign	Urbana/Champaign, Illinois	56,644	
7	Florida International University	Miami, Florida	55,582	
8	University of Minnesota	Minneapolis, Minnesota	54,955	
9	University of Texas at Austin	Austin, Texas	52,384	
10	Georgia State University	Atlanta, Georgia	51,995	

== 2021–22 enrollment ==
Ten largest public university campuses by enrollment during the 2021–22 academic year
Ranking	University	Location	Enrollments	Reference(s)
1	Texas A&M University	College Station, Texas	73,283	
2	University of Central Florida	Orlando, Florida	70,386	
3	Ohio State University	Columbus, Ohio	61,677	
4	University of Florida	Gainesville, Florida	60,613	
5	Florida International University	Miami, Florida	56,592	
6	University of Illinois Urbana-Champaign	Urbana/Champaign, Illinois	56,257	
7	Arizona State University	Tempe, Arizona	54,866	
8	University of Minnesota	Minneapolis, Minnesota	52,736	
9	Georgia State University	Atlanta, Georgia	52,530	
10	University of Texas at Austin	Austin, Texas	51,992	

== 2020–21 enrollment ==
Ten largest public university campuses by enrollment during the 2020–21 academic year
Ranking	University	Location	Enrollment	Reference(s)
1	University of Central Florida	Orlando, Florida	71,913	
2	Texas A&M University	College Station, Texas	71,109	
3	Ohio State University	Columbus, Ohio	61,369	
4	Florida International University	Miami, Florida	58,928	
5	University of Florida	Gainesville, Florida	57,841	
6	Georgia State University	Atlanta, Georgia	53,737	
7	Arizona State University	Tempe, Arizona	52,386	
8	University of Illinois Urbana-Champaign	Urbana/Champaign, Illinois	52,331	
9	University of Minnesota	Minneapolis-Saint Paul, Minnesota	52,017	
10	University of Texas at Austin	Austin, Texas	51,832	

== 2019–20 enrollment ==
Ten largest public university campuses by enrollment during the 2019–20 academic year
Ranking	University	Location	Enrollment	Reference(s)
1	University of Central Florida	Orlando, Florida	69,523	
2	Texas A&M University	College Station, Texas	66,746	
3	Ohio State University	Columbus, Ohio	61,391	
4	Florida International University	Miami, Florida	58,787	
5	University of Florida	Gainesville, Florida	56,567	
6	Georgia State University	Atlanta, Georgia	53,619	
7	Arizona State University	Tempe, Arizona	53,494	
8	University of South Florida	Tampa, Florida	51,646	
9	University of Minnesota	Minneapolis-Saint Paul, Minnesota	51,327	
10	University of Illinois Urbana-Champaign	Urbana/Champaign, Illinois	51,196	

== 2018–19 enrollment ==
Ten largest public university campuses by enrollment during the 2018–19 academic year
Ranking	University	Location	Enrollment	Reference(s)
1	University of Central Florida	Orlando, Florida	68,558	
2	Texas A&M University	College Station, Texas	66,561	
3	Ohio State University	Columbus, Ohio	61,170	
4	Florida International University	Miami, Florida	58,063	
5	University of Florida	Gainesville, Florida	56,079	
6	Georgia State University	Atlanta, Georgia	52,814	
7	University of Texas at Austin	Austin, Texas	51,832	
8	Arizona State University	Tempe, Arizona	51,585	
9	University of Minnesota	Minneapolis/Saint Paul, Minnesota	50,943	
10	University of South Florida	Tampa, Florida	50,755	

== 2017–18 enrollment ==
Ten largest public university campuses by enrollment during the 2017–18 academic year
Ranking	University	Location	Enrollment	Reference(s)
1	University of Central Florida	Orlando, Florida	66,183	
2	Texas A&M University	College Station, Texas	65,582	
3	Ohio State University	Columbus, Ohio	59,696	
4	Florida International University	Miami, Florida	56,851	
5	University of Florida	Gainesville, Florida	52,669	
6	University of Minnesota	Minneapolis/Saint Paul, Minnesota	51,848	
7	University of Texas at Austin	Austin, Texas	51,525	
8	Arizona State University	Tempe, Arizona	51,164	
9	Georgia State University	Atlanta, Georgia	51,000	
10	University of South Florida	Tampa, Florida	50,577	

== 2016–17 enrollment ==
Ten largest public university campuses by enrollment during the 2016–17 academic year
Ranking	University	Location	Enrollment	Reference(s)
1	University of Central Florida	Orlando, Florida	62,335	
2	Texas A&M University	College Station, Texas	60,435	
3	Ohio State University	Columbus, Ohio	59,482	
4	Florida International University	Miami, Florida	55,111	
5	University of Florida	Gainesville, Florida	52,367	
6	Arizona State University	Tempe, Arizona	51,869	
7	University of Minnesota	Minneapolis/Saint Paul, Minnesota	51,580	
8	University of Texas at Austin	Austin, Texas	51,331	
9	Michigan State University	East Lansing, Michigan	50,344	
10	Indiana University	Bloomington, Indiana	49,695	

== 2015–16 enrollment ==
Ten largest public university campuses by enrollment during the 2015–16 academic year
Ranking	University	Location	Enrollment	Reference(s)
1	University of Central Florida	Orlando, Florida	63,016	
2	Ohio State University	Columbus, Ohio	58,663	
3	Texas A&M University	College Station, Texas	58,515	
4	Florida International University	Miami, Florida	54,058	
5	University of Florida	Gainesville, Florida	52,518	
6	Arizona State University	Tempe, Arizona	51,984	
7	University of Texas at Austin	Austin, Texas	50,950	
8	University of Minnesota	Minneapolis/Saint Paul, Minnesota	50,678	
9	Michigan State University	East Lansing, Michigan	50,543	
10	Indiana University	Bloomington, Indiana	48,514	

== 2013–14 enrollment ==
Ten largest public university campuses by enrollment during the 2013–14 academic year
Ranking	University	Location	Enrollment	Reference(s)
1	Arizona State University	Tempe, Arizona	62,599	
2	University of Central Florida	Orlando, Florida	59,770	
3	Ohio State University	Columbus, Ohio	58,322	
4	Florida International University (Note: Official main campus enrollment count includes students enrolled in relatively small regional campuses.)	Miami, Florida	52,986	
5	Texas A&M University	College Station, Texas	52,449	
6	University of Minnesota	Minneapolis/Saint Paul, Minnesota	51,147	
7	University of Texas at Austin	Austin, Texas	51,145	
8	Michigan State University	East Lansing, Michigan	50,085	
9	University of Florida	Gainesville, Florida	49,042	
10	Indiana University	Bloomington, Indiana	46,817	

== 2012–13 enrollment ==
Ten largest public university campuses by enrollment during the 2012–13 academic year
Ranking	University	Location	Enrollment	Reference(s)
1	Arizona State University	Tempe, Arizona	60,169	
2	University of Central Florida	Orlando, Florida	60,048	
3	Ohio State University	Columbus, Ohio	57,466	
4	University of Texas at Austin	Austin, Texas	52,186	
5	University of Minnesota	Minneapolis/Saint Paul, Minnesota	51,853	
6	Florida International University	Miami, Florida	50,396	
7	Texas A&M University	College Station, Texas	50,227	
8	University of Florida	Gainesville, Florida	49,913	
9	Michigan State University	East Lansing, Michigan	48,906	
10	Pennsylvania State University	University Park, Pennsylvania	45,351	

== 2011–12 enrollment ==
Ten largest public university campuses by enrollment during the 2011–12 academic year
Ranking	University	Location	Enrollment	Reference(s)
1	Arizona State University	Tempe, Arizona	59,794	
2	University of Central Florida	Orlando, Florida	58,587	
3	Ohio State University	Columbus, Ohio	56,867	
4	University of Minnesota	Minneapolis/Saint Paul, Minnesota	52,557	
5	University of Texas at Austin	Austin, Texas	51,112	
6	Texas A&M University	College Station, TX	49,861	
7	University of Florida	Gainesville, Florida	49,589	
8	Florida International University	Miami, Florida	47,966	
9	Michigan State University	East Lansing, Michigan	47,800	
10	Pennsylvania State University	University Park, Pennsylvania	44,485	

== 2010–11 enrollment ==
Ten largest public university campuses by enrollment during the 2010–11 academic year
Ranking	University	Location	Enrollment	Reference(s)
1	Arizona State University	Tempe, Arizona	58,000	
2	University of Central Florida	Orlando, Florida	56,235	
3	Ohio State University	Columbus, Ohio	56,064	
4	University of Minnesota	Minneapolis/Saint Paul, Minnesota	51,721	
5	University of Texas at Austin	Austin, Texas	51,195	
6	University of Florida	Gainesville, Florida	49,827	
7	Texas A&M University	College Station, Texas	49,129	
8	Michigan State University	East Lansing, Michigan	47,131	
9	Pennsylvania State University	University Park, Pennsylvania	44,034	
10	Florida International University	Miami, Florida	44,010	

== 2009–10 enrollment ==
Ten largest public university campuses by enrollment during the 2009–10 academic year
Ranking	University	Location	Enrollment	Reference(s)
1	Arizona State University	Tempe, Arizona	55,552	
2	Ohio State University	Columbus, Ohio	55,014	
3	University of Central Florida	Orlando, Florida	53,537	
4	University of Minnesota	Minneapolis/Saint Paul, Minnesota	51,659	
5	University of Texas at Austin	Austin, Texas	51,032	
6	University of Florida	Gainesville, Florida	50,691	
7	Texas A&M University	College Station, Texas	48,885	
8	Michigan State University	East Lansing, Michigan	47,100	
9	Pennsylvania State University	University Park, Pennsylvania	44,832	
10	Indiana University Bloomington	Bloomington, Indiana	42,347	

== See also ==
- List of largest universities
- List of largest United States universities by enrollment
- List of largest United States universities by undergraduate enrollment
