= Banker to the Poor =

1999 autobiography by Muhammad Yunus and Alan Jolis

- Author: Muhammad Yunus, Alan Jolis
- Language: English
- Subject: Economics, Poverty
- Genre: Autobiography
- Publisher: PublicAffairs
- Publication date: 1999
- Publication place: Bangladesh
- Media type: Paperback
- Pages: 288
- ISBN: 1-58648-198-3
- OCLC: 40723664
- Dewey Decimal: 332.1/095492 21
- LC Class: HG3290.6.A6 Y86 1999
- Preceded by: Banker to the Poor: The Autobiography of Muhammad Yunus, Founder of Grameen Bank

Banker to the Poor: Micro-Lending and the Battle Against World Poverty is an autobiography of 2006 Nobel Peace Prize Winner and Grameen Bank founder Muhammad Yunus. The book describes Yunus' early life, moving into his college years, and into his years as a professor at Chittagong University. While a professor at Chittagong University, Yunus began to take notice of the extreme poverty of the villagers around him. In 1976, Yunus incorporated the help of Maimuna Begum to collect data of people in Jobra who were living in poverty. Most of these impoverished people would take a loan from moneylenders to buy some raw material, using that raw material to create some product, and then selling back the good to the moneylender to repay the loan, earning a very meager profit. One 21-year-old woman, Sufia Begum, who was interviewed, earned no more than two cents per day making bamboo stools under this system.The list Begum brought back to Yunus named 42 women who were living on credit of 856 taka (which is equivalent to 27 U.S. dollars).

Upon seeing this data, Yunus found it regrettable that all it took was 856 taka to bring these women to self-sustainability. He decided to loan them his personal money with no collateral attached and no interest on the loan. After this money was all repaid, he continued to survey the community to see if this was a rare occurrence. He found that the cycle of essential enslavement to moneylenders was far too common throughout the country of Bangladesh. Yunus decided that something must be done. He went to his local bank and asked them to loan money to these poor and destitute borrowers. His local bank refused. He took the case clear up to the top bank in Dhaka, finally securing credit to loan to local borrowers. Thus, in January 1977, the Grameen Bank was born.

This bank started under completely new principles, different than any other bank in Bangladesh at the time. Its premise was that each borrower had a human right to credit. The borrowers had to form groups of five people in order to provide some type of security on the loan. A loan was then given to two members of the group. After payments were successfully made for six straight weeks, the next two members could take out a loan from Grameen. The chairperson is usually the last person to obtain ability to borrow. The repayment terms for the loans follows five basic guidelines: (1) loans last one year, (2) installments on the loan are to be paid weekly, (3) repayment on the loan begins one week after the loan is extended, (4) the interest rate is 20% on the loan, and (5) repayment every week is 2% of the total loan for fifty weeks straight. This micro-credit program, started by Grameen, has been tested throughout Bangladesh and has even been expanded into much of the world today through similar programs of different names. This micro-credit system has been proven to work over and over again with minor variances on the major principles.

In 1987 a Grameen program opened up in a country other than Bangladesh – Malaysia – and soon micro-credit banks based on the Grameen bank appeared in countries such as the Philippines, India, Nepal, Vietnam, China, Latin America, Africa, the United States, and Europe. The micro-finance model of Grameen has proved versatile and has adapted well to the customs of many countries.

As Grameen continued to grow, it branched out into new projects to aid the poor. In 1986 Grameen acquired 783 ponds to eventually start a Fisheries Foundation, utilizing previously unused resources while providing jobs for the local poor. Grameen Uddog (which means Grameen Initiatives) began in 1993, created an avenue for poor textile weavers in Bangladesh to sell their quality cloth to the garment industry. A cell phone business was the next to open up, in 1997. One Grameen borrower in each rural Bangladesh village was entrusted with a cell phone and the job of selling telephone service to her neighbors. GrameenPhone is the name of the nonprofit company that deals directly with the villagers. This company, in turn, buys airtime from a for profit company called Grameen Telecom. Grameen also formed a nonprofit company called Grameen Shakti (meaning energy) in 1996 to provide renewable energy sources. Also in 1996, an Internet provider called Grameen Cybernet was introduced. To further education and research purposes in Bangladesh, a second internet provider called Grameen Communications was started as well.

Banker to the Poor concludes with a description of Yunus' dream – a poverty-free world. Yunus believes that charity is not the way to become a poverty-free world. Instead, he states, "the real issue is creating a level playing field for everybody, giving every human being a fair chance."

The Italian film company Eurofilm s.r.l. owns the worldwide and exclusive film and television rights of the book. Film director Marco Amenta is currently working on making the film Banker to the Poor for the big screen, based on the international bestseller.

The movie tells the story of Muhammad Yunus, a Bengali economist and banker, inventor of microcredit and recipient of the Nobel Peace Prize in 2006 along with his Grameen Bank. For the script of his Banker to the Poor, written together with the famous Sergio Donati, Amenta was awarded and praised by Robert De Niro at the Tribeca Film Festival. Italian producer Simonetta Amenta purchased the film rights to the story through her company Eurofilm - before Professor Yunus won the Nobel Prize.

== Grameen Bank and poverty reduction ==
In Muhammad Yunus' early efforts to alleviate poverty in the regions near his home, he worked to improve local farmers' crop yields. Though he succeeded in his short-term project goals, he discovered another problem: a whole section of Bangladesh's poor had slipped through the cracks in poverty reduction programs. To combat that problem, he researched the poor in the village of Jobra, later redefining the previously vague 'poverty' and developing and studying categories of 'poor people.' In Banker to the Poor, Yunus writes: "I found it useful to use three broad definitions of poor to describe the situation in Bangladesh: P1—the bottom 20 percent of the population (absolute poor) P2—bottom 35 percent of the population P3—bottom 50 percent of the population Watching the poor in each of these categories, he discovered that slightly impoverished citizens who were eligible for aid crowded out those who desperately needed aid. When Yunus started Grameen Bank, he tailored its programs toward these desperately poor. Some people disagree that Yunus' approaches are the best possible way to address poverty or microfinance. For instance, Milford Bateman with the Overseas Development Institute wrote, "When microfinance-funded enterprises are set up, they tend simply to displace other tiny businesses without funding, meaning there is generally no net impact on poverty." Bateman also contends, "It turns out that as more and more microenterprises were crowded into the same local economic space, the returns on each one began to fall dramatically. Starting a new business or a basket-making operation or driving a rickshaw required few skills and only a tiny amount of capital, but such a project generated very little income, because everyone else was pretty much already doing exactly the same things in order to survive." In Yunus' attempt to help the absolute poor (which is different from the 'nonpoor' or middle business sector of the economy), Bateman argues that he inadvertently crowded out this vital middle business sector, hurting the absolute poor to which he devoted Grameen's efforts. Bateman further argues, "To the extent that local savings and remittance income are increasingly channeled into such simple activities via microfinance institutions, and so channeled away from more sophisticated and scaled-up activities associated with small and medium enterprises, the more the economic structure of that country, region or locality is inevitably undermined and destroyed."
