= Arturo Cucciolla =

Italian architect (1948–2021)

- Born: 21 January 1948; Bari, Italy
- Died: 19 August 2021 (aged 73); Bari, Italy
- Education: Sapienza University of Rome
- Occupation: Architect

Arturo Cucciolla (21 January 1948 – 19 August 2021) was an Italian architect and academic known for his work in urban regeneration and public architecture, particularly in the Apulia region.

== Life and career ==
After graduating in architecture from the University of Rome in 1972, Cucciolla began an academic career and later taught courses in history of contemporary architecture and architectural design at the Polytechnic University of Bari.

Alongside his teaching activity, he has been active in professional practice and public debate on issues such as territorial planning, restoration, and the redevelopment of historic and abandoned urban areas. His projects often focus on the transformation and reuse of existing urban fabric rather than simple expansion, aiming to integrate new architecture within historically layered city environments.

He also collaborated with the Apulian edition of the newspaper la Repubblica.

Cucciolla's projects include several urban redevelopment initiatives in Bari, such as interventions in the historic center, the renewal of Piazza del Ferrarese and the Muraglia in Bari Vecchia, and Piazza Carabellese. Other works include the redevelopment of Piazza Vittorio Emanuele II in Monopoli, the restoration and adaptive reuse of the Faculty of Foreign Languages at the University of Bari, the design of the didactic and administrative center of the Faculty of Medicine, the regional headquarters of CGIL in the Stanic district of Bari, and the new facility "Asclepios" at the Bari Polyclinic.

Cucciolla died in Bari in 2021.

== Books ==
- Cucciolla, Arturo (1977). Bari: questione urbana e piano regolatore. Bari.
- Borri, Dino; Cucciolla, Arturo; Morelli, Dario (1980). Questione urbana e sviluppo edilizio. Il caso di Bari. Bari: Dedalo.
- Cucciolla, Arturo (1984). La formazione del Bauhaus. Architettura in Germania tra 800 e 900. Bari: Edipuglia.
- Cucciolla, Arturo (1984). Bauhaus: lo spazio dell'architettura. Bari: Edipuglia.
- Cucciolla, Arturo (1988). Urbanistica: verso il governo della complessità. La città fra espansione e riuso. Bari.
- Cucciolla, Arturo (1994). La città vecchia di Bari. Un problema di recupero e riuso. Bari.
- Cucciolla, Arturo; Di Marzo, Marcello; Zezza, Fulvio (2003). Recupero delle mura di S. Scolastica nella città vecchia di Bari. Bari: Adda.
- Cucciolla, Arturo (2006). Vecchie città-città nuove: Concezio Petrucci 1926–1946. Bari: Dedalo.

== Archive ==
Cucciolla's private archive has been preserved since 2022 at the State Archives of Bari as an archive of historical and cultural interest.
