= Università "Italian University Line" =

- Università Telematica Degli Studi
- Established: 2005; 21 years ago
- Location: Florence, Italy
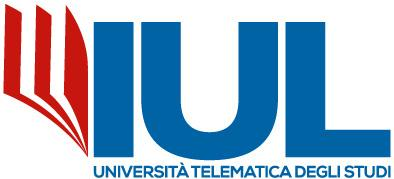

The Italian University Line (Italian: Università Telematica Degli Studi), often abbreviated as IUL, is a private distance-learning university founded in 2005 in Florence, Italy. The school provides e-learning courses in centres throughout Italy.

== See also ==
- List of Italian universities
- Distance education
