= Danilo Iervolino =

Italian businessman (born 1978)

- Born: April 2, 1978 (age 48); Italy
- Education: Parthenope University of Naples
- Occupation: Businessman
- Known for: Founder of Università Telematica Pegaso; owner of U.S. Salernitana 1919
- Father: Antonio Iervolino

Danilo Iervolino (born 2 April 1978) is an Italian businessman who is the owner of Salernitana.

== Early life ==
Iervolino attended the Parthenope University of Naples in Italy.

== Career ==
Iervolino founded the Università degli Studi Pegaso.

== Personal life ==
Iervolino is the son of Italian lawyer Antonio Iervolino.

== Legal Conviction ==
In 2019, Danilo Iervolino was involved in a legal investigation for alleged corruption linked to the Ministry of Labor. The main accusation revolved around the employment of Antonio Rossi, the son of high-ranking official Concetta Ferrari, at Università degli Studi Pegaso. This hiring was allegedly a "reward" for Ferrari, who, using her influence, facilitated the splitting of the Encal-Inpal patronage into two separate entities: Encal-Cisal and Inpal.

This division, initially rejected by the Ministry, reportedly brought significant financial benefits to the newly created patronages. Iervolino allegedly managed the operation in collaboration with Francesco Cavallaro, General Secretary of Cisal (sentenced to five years in prison), and Mario Rosario Miele, a collaborator of Iervolino (sentenced to two years and eight months).

Francesco Fimmanò, Pegaso University’s scientific director, was acquitted, while Ferrari and other individuals remain under trial. The case has raised concerns about potential conflicts of interest and favoritism within public institutions and private universities.
