= Pegaso University =

University in Naples, Italy

Coordinates: 40.8374°N 14.2488°E

- Università degli Studi Pegaso
- Motto: La tecnologia più potente al mondo al tuo servizio (The most powerful technology in the world at your service)
- Type: Private and online
- Established: 2006
- Affiliations: Mediterranean Universities Union (UNIMED)
- President: Danilo Iervolino
- Rector: Michele Corsi and Luigia Melillo
- Director: Elio Pariota
- Students: 100.000
- Location: Naples, Italy
- Campus: Multiple sites
- Language: Italian
- Website: www.unipegaso.it

The Pegaso University (Italian: Università degli Studi Pegaso or Pegaso Università Telematica), often abbreviated as "Unipegaso", is an open (Italian: aperta) university founded in 2006 in Naples, Italy. The university is accredited and recognized by the Italian Ministry of Education. It is ranked among the top three online universities in Italy based on the number of students enrolled in the 2023/2024 academic year, which amounted to 3,570.

== Method of Study ==
It provides blended academic courses and it spreads across Italy (in over 90 places across various italian cities) and abroad.

Academic qualifications awarded by public or private Open Universities are equal in academic standard to qualifications issued by traditional on-campus institutions. They have the same legal value, they are well-respected, and they were highly prefer during the COVID-19 pandemic.

== Structure and Organization ==
The Pegaso University offers degree programmes upon a variety of academic fields including Economics, Law, Development and Engineering, Education, Linguistics, Communication and Media Studies, Tourism, Management, Psychology, etc.

All academic programmes are fully recognised by the Italian Government (MIUR GU n. 118 del 23.5.2006 – SO n. 125), being highly respected and approved of by similar open/distance institutions in Europe and abroad, including the Open University of the UK.

Pegaso International Higher Education Institution (Malta) is a stand-alone member institution, fully recognised by the Maltese Government, belongs to the British Commonwealth Academic Association, and offers International Bachelor's, Master's, and Doctoral programmes in Malta, Italy and abroad - all of which are fully and unconditionally recognized as European Qualifications.

It is part of Euro-Mediterranean Union (UNIMED), along with other universities such as the University of Strasbourg (France), the University of Barcelona (Spain), the National and Kapodistrian University of Athens (Greece), the University of Cyprus (Cyprus), etc. As an international academic institution, Pegaso is fully accredited by ASIC UK (Accreditation Service for International Schools, Colleges and Universities) on the grounds of its Premises, Health, Safety, Governance, Learning, Teaching and Research Activity, Immigration Regulations etc.

This University belongs to the 21st century distance-learning institutions and goes in tandem with other recent and technologically powerful institutions, like Mercatorum University, Frederick University, Università degli Studi eCampus, Hong Kong Metropolitan University, Open University Malaysia, Open University of the Netherlands etc.

== Legal Conviction ==
In 2019, Danilo Iervolino, founder and President of the University, was involved in a legal investigation for alleged corruption linked to the Ministry of Labour. The main accusation revolved around the employment of Antonio Rossi, the son of high-ranking official Concetta Ferrari, at Università degli studi Pegaso. This hiring was allegedly a "reward" for Ferrari, who, using her influence, facilitated the splitting of the Encal-Inpal patronage into two separate entities: Encal-Cisal and Inpal.

This division, initially rejected by the Ministry, reportedly brought significant financial benefits to the newly created patronages. Iervolino allegedly managed the operation in collaboration with Francesco Cavallaro, General Secretary of Cisal (sentenced to five years in prison), and Mario Rosario Miele, a collaborator of Iervolino (sentenced to two years and eight months).

Francesco Fimmanò, Pegaso University’s scientific director, was acquitted, while Ferrari and other individuals remain under trial. The case has raised concerns about potential conflicts of interest and favoritism within public institutions and private universities.

== Accreditation and memberships ==
- MIUR – Ministero dell' Istruzione / Ministero dell' Università e della Ricerca
- ASIC UK Accredited
- The Hellenic/Greek Ministry of Education (ΥΠΕΠΘ) and the Hellenic/Greek Naric (DOATAP/ΔΟΑΤΑΠ)
- QISAN
- ISO 14001:2004 certified
- ISO 9001:2008 certified
- EMUNI – Euro-Mediterranean University of Slovenia
- UNIMED – Unione delle Università del Mediterraneo (Mediterranean Universities Union)
- SVIMEZ – Associazione per lo sviluppo dell’industria nel Mezzogiorno (Association for the development of Southern Italy Business)
- RUIAP – Rete Universitaria Italiana per l’Apprendimento Permanente (Italian Lifelong Learning University Net)
- Pegaso Online University is member of Multiversity SpA alliance:
  - Universitas Mercatorum (Republic of Italy EU);
  - Pegaso International (Republic of Malta EU);
  - European Polytechnical University (Republic of Bulgaria EU)

== See also ==
- List of Italian universities
- Naples
- Distance education
- Hellenic Open University
- Marconi University
- Università degli Studi Niccolò Cusano
- Open University of Cyprus
- Università telematica internazionale Uninettuno
- Open University
- Ministry of Education, University and Research (Italy)
- Pegasus
