= Istituto Superiore per le Industrie Artistiche =

Type of university in Italy

ISIA - Istituto Superiore per le Industrie Artistiche (Higher Institute for Artistic Industries), is a type of public university-level institute mainly training students in the field of design. As of 2023, there are 5 ISIAs, located in Faenza, Florence, Pescara, Rome, and Urbino. They are part of the AFAM (Higher Education in Art, Music, and Dance, Italian: Alta Formazione Artistica, Musicale e Coreutica) division of the Italian Ministry of University and Research.

== The Institutions ==
=== Rome ===
Rome ISIA is Italy's oldest institution in the field of industrial design. It was founded in 1965 as Industrial Design and Visual Communication Course for architects and engineers, and changed its name in 1973. It follows the European tradition of the Bauhaus and the Hochschule für Gestaltung of Ulm, grafting their methodologies onto Italian creative culture. Rome ISIA has received many prizes and acknowledgements, and is the only European institution to have won the Compasso d'Oro by Associazione per il Disegno Industriale ADI (Industrial Design Association) twice (1979 and 1987). Rome ISIA is a member of the Cumulus, the International Association of Universities and Colleges of Art, Media and Design.

Rome ISIA offers a three-year undergraduate program leading to a Bachelor of Arts in Industrial Design (180 ECTS-credits), a two-year Master's program in Systems Design (120 ECTS-credits), and a two-year Doctor of Philosophy in Interaction Design. Thirty new students are admitted to the BA and MA programs each year.

==== Subsidiaries ====
Rome ISIA has a subsidiary in Pordenone (since 2011) offering a Bachelor and a Master of Arts.

=== Florence ===
Florence ISIA was founded in 1975 is a member of the Cumulus as well.

Florence ISIA offers a three-year undergraduate program leading to a Bachelor of Arts in Industrial Design, and two two-year Master's programs: an MA in Product Design and an MA in Communication Design.

=== Faenza ===
Faenza ISIA was founded in 1980. The structure of its course was formerly different from the other ISIAs as the experimentation was mainly focused on ceramic products. By the end of the 1990s, its attention moved towards product design in general.

Faenza ISIA offers a three-year undergraduate program leading to a Bachelor of Arts in Product Design and Design with Advanced Ceramic Materials, and two two-year Master's programs: an MA in Product Design and Design with Advanced Materials and an MA in Communication Design.

=== Urbino ===
Urbino ISIA was founded in 1974 and trains students in the field of graphic and editorial design.

Urbino ISIA offers a three-year undergraduate program leading to a Bachelor of Arts in Graphic Design and Visual Communication, and three two-year Master's programs: an MA in Communication, Design and Publishing and an MA in Illustration and an MA in Photography.

=== Pescara ===
Pescara ISIA was established in 2009 as a subsidiary of Rome's ISIA. It became a separate institution in 2015.
