= San Raffaele University of Rome =

Coordinates: 41.8969°N 12.4099°E

- Università telematica San Raffaele
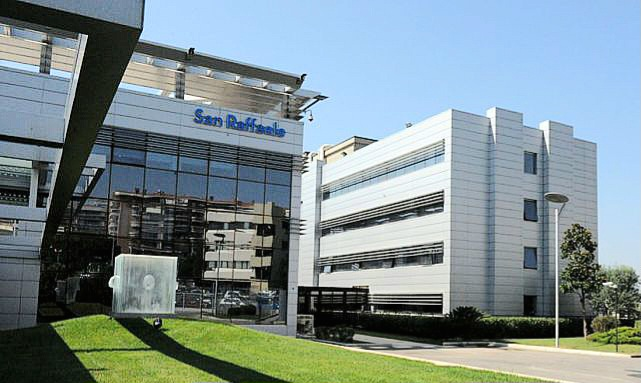
- Type: Private
- Established: 2006
- President: Fabio Domenico Vaccarono
- Rector: Vilberto Stocchi
- Location: Rome, Italy
- Website: www.uniroma5.it/

The San Raffaele University of Rome (Italian: Università telematica San Raffaele), often simply abbreviated as "UniSanRaffaele" is a private online university founded in 2006 in Rome, Italy.

== Method of study ==
The university provides e-learning courses, remotely, with orientation centers ("e-learning points") scattered throughout Italy.

== Rectors ==
- Albert Albertini
- Giuseppe Rotilio
- Enrico Garaci
- Vilberto Stocchi

== See also ==
- List of Italian universities
- Rome
- Distance education
