= Polytechnic University of Bari =

University in Bari, Italy

- Politecnico di Bari
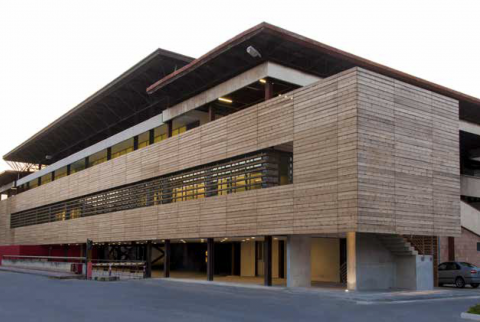
- Motto: de' remi facemmo ali
- Type: State-supported
- Established: 1990
- Rector: Prof. Umberto Fratino
- Director: Enrico Brighi
- Location: Bari; Foggia; Taranto, Italy; 41.1089°N 16.8789°E
- Campus: Urban
- Sports teams: CUS Bari
- Website: www.poliba.it

The Polytechnic University of Bari (Italian: Politecnico di Bari) is a university located in Bari, Italy. It was founded in 1990 and it is organized into five departments.

In 2018, around 10,072 students were enrolled. In 2018, the academic staff amounted to 275 people.

== History and structure ==
The Polytechnic University of Bari was established with Italian law "Legge n. 245" of 7 August 1990. It is the youngest among the Italian polytechnic universities (the other two being Politecnico di Milano and Politecnico di Torino). Even though other Italian universities also incorporate engineering and science faculties, Italian polytechnic universities are focused on technological faculties and subjects.

Following the reform initiated with the Italian law Legge n. 240 of 2010 and successive modifications, the Polytechnic University of Bari has organized its structure prominently based on departments with an aggregation into five big departments, most of which divided into branches:

- Department of Electric Engineering and Computer Engineering
- Department of Mechanical Engineering, Mathematics and Management
- Department of Civil Engineering, Environmental Engineering, Construction Engineering and Chemistry
- Department of Architecture
- Department of Physics (named after Michelangelo Merlin)

== The Headquarters ==
Most of the structures, classrooms, halls and departments are located inside the campus "Ernesto Quagliariello" in Bari. It is shared with the University of Bari (only for scientific subjects), and it is located close to via Orabona. In the nearby via Amendola are the rector's office and the administrative offices for enrollment and similar inquiries. In Bari's Japigia quarter are located most of the offices and

University rankings

Global – Overall
- QS World: 801-850 (2026)

laboratories of the Departments of Mechanical Engineering, Mathematics and Management.

The Polytechnic University of Bari is also present in other two separate branches, in Foggia and Taranto (where "Centro Interdipartimentale Magna Grecia" is located).

== See also ==
- List of Italian universities
- Bari
