= Marco Amenta =

Italian director and producer

Marco Amenta (Palermo, 11 August 1970) is an Italian director, producer, and photojournalist.

== Biography ==
After attending the Liceo Classico Umberto I in Palermo, Amenta started his career at Il Giornale di Sicilia as a photojournalist.

In 1992 he moved to Paris where he obtained the Degree in Cinematography from the University Paris 8 and where worked for agencies and magazines, making many short films in film.

During the war in ex-Yugoslavia he filmed the documentary Born in Bosnia for French TV, presented at the festival "Palermocinema" and another documentary in Cuba, Lettre de Cuba, winner of the French "Rouletabille" for young filmmakers.

In 1995 he produced and directed the documentary film Diary of a Sicilian Rebel, official selection (out of competition) at the "54th Venice Film Festival." The film won 21 international awards, including 1st prize International Festival "50th Prix Italia" - 1st prize "Medianet Award" International Festival of Monaco di Baviera - 1st prize "Le Nombre d'Or" International Festival of Amsterdam—1st prize "Festival Internazionale del Cinema di Troia" (Lisbon) - 1st Prize "International Festival of Montevideo (Uruguay) - 1st Prize" International Festival of Carolina "(USA) - Certificate of Merit at the" Festival of Int San Francisco (USA) - Special Jury Prize at the "International Festival in Houston (USA) - 2nd prize International Festival of Monte Carlo". Is also prime time broadcast by RAI TV and 30 other TV stations worldwide.

In 2004 wrote and directed the documentary The Last Godfather, an Italo-French coproduction, with Mediterranean Films and ARTE France, sold to television in Norway, Belgium, Switzerland, Spain, Ireland and many other countries.

== Filmography ==
=== The Ghost Of Corleone ===
In 2005 he directed The Ghost of Corleone, documentary film about life and hunting to Bernardo Provenzano, produced by Eurofilm in co-production with ARD Germany and ARTE France. Purchased by Rai Cinema and Sky Italia. Released in cinemas on 30 March 2006, obtained a considerable success with the public and critics and Nomination to the "Golden Globes" 2006 and "Nastri d'Argento" in 2007 as best documentary released in cinemas in Italy. Received, in addition, the award "Best Production 2006" in The AltroCinema FF and Etruria Cinema in 2007.

=== The Sicilian Girl ===
In February 2009, came out in cinemas across Italy his debut film The Sicilian Girl, after it was successfully presented at the "Rome International Film Festival". The movie is a co production between Italy (Eurofilm, R&C e Rai Cinema) and French (Roissy Film). The main actors of the movie are Gerard Jugnot (Les Choristes), Veronica d’Agostino (Respiro), Paolo Briguglia (I Cento Passi, La Terra), Lucia Sardo (I Cento Passi, Ma che Colpa abbiamo noi)), Marcello Mazzarella (Placido Rizzotto, Rosso Malpelo), Francesco Casisa (Respiro, The Golden Door)

The movie was in competition at last Rome Film Festival and was very well received by critics and audience. Now The Sicilian Girl ("La Sicilienne" in France) is in Italy theatrical distribution and 13 May 2009 had a French theatrical distribution by Rezo Film where was very well received by critics. "The Sicilian Girl" will be releasing in Australia, Belgium, Holland, Luxembourg, Israel. China, etc.

The movie was nominated at David Donatello (Italian Cinema Oscar) as "Best New Director for his first feature film" and as "Best movie for students" and It was nominated at Nastri D’Argento as "Best New Director". Marco Amenta was recently awarded as a "Best Director" at Miami Sicilian Film Festival, as "Best Movie" at Stretto di Messina Film Festival, "Best First Features Film" and "Los Angeles Cinema Italian Style" at Magna Grecia FF, "Best Movie" at Roseto Film Festival and "Best Movie" at Maremetraggio Film Festival (Trieste). In 2010 the movie was awarded at Bastia Film festival with Best Audience Award and Best movie for youth.

"The Sicilian Girl" was selected at Durban Film festival (2009) and Norwegian Film festival (2009), Palm Spring Film Festival (2010). Also it was selected to represent the Italian cinema at "Italian-Tokio Film Festival" and OpenRoad Film Festival in New York, N.I.C.E. Seattle and San Francisco FF.

=== Banker To The Poor ===
Amenta is currently working on his new film Banker to the Poor, based on the international bestseller. The movie tells the story of Muhammad Yunus, a Bengali economist and banker, inventor of microcredit and Nobel Peace Prize in 2006 along with his Grameen Bank. For the script of his "Banker to the Poor", written together with the famous Sergio Donati, Amenta was rewarded by Robert De Niro at the Tribeca Film Festival. Marco Amenta, Simonetta Amenta and her Eurofilm Company purchased the film rights before Professor Yunus won the Nobel Prize when he was unknown to most people.
