= University of Rome Unitelma Sapienza =

Private university in Rome, Italy

Coordinates: 41.9045°N 12.5180°E

- Università degli Studi di Roma "Unitelma Sapienza"
- Type: Private
- Established: 2004
- Chancellor: Prof. Antonello Folco Biagini
- Rector: Prof. Francesco Avallone
- Location: Rome, Italy
- Website: www.unitelmasapienza.it

The University of Rome Unitelma Sapienza, formerly known as Unitelma Sapienza University (Italian: Università degli Studi di Roma "Unitelma Sapienza"), often simply abbreviated as "Unitelma - Sapienza," is a private university founded in 2004 in Rome, Italy. Unitelma - Sapienza is the only on-line Italian university that is maintained by a consortium composed of public universities and enterprises.

Since 2010 it is linked to and owned by one of the top Italian public universities, Sapienza University of Rome, which uses Unitelma Sapienza to promote the right to education and to support non-traditional students. La Sapienza is among the most prestigious universities in Italy, and the only Italian university among the first 100 universities in the world. Sapienza University of Rome, one of the largest universities in Europe by enrollment, has over 130,000 students and a staff of 4,000 teachers and researchers. Sapienza and Unitelma Sapienza, which are located in Rome, offer multiple joint degrees with faculty often teaching at both universities.

== Method of Study ==
The university provides e-learning courses to students around the world and at remote centers throughout Italy, offering several courses taught in English, Italian, or Spanish to students. The university generally requires exams be completed at its Rome campus, while apprenticeships can be completed at international research sites.

== Mission and History ==
Unitelma Sapienza, through the use of advanced information technology and methodologies in distance learning, promotes access to higher education to students who are unable to attend regular educational activities. The university pays particular attention to the development of research, in particular within scientific and economic sectors, as well as in management of information technology, with particular attention to theories, models, processes, technologies and applications for the development of a virtual campus through the internet.

A special focus is given to tutoring: the university offers tutors concerned with academic activities, student motivation, and the achievement of student career goals. The university aims to combine the foci to increase interactivity with students for a more cooperative learning environment.

== Academics ==
The university has several faculties focusing on specialized courses at both the undergraduate and post-graduate levels and teaching in multiple languages. As of November 2019, Unitelma Sapienza offered the following courses:

Degrees offered jointly with Sapienza University of Rome:

- Masters in Classical Archaeology (English-language)
- Masters in International Cooperation, Finance and Development (English-language)
- Masters in Applied Nutrition and Diet Science (Italian-language)
- Masters in Regulatory Disciplines and Drug Policy (Italian-language, in cooperation with National Academy of Medicine)
- Masters in Health
- Masters in Public Administration
- Masters in Criminology
- Bachelors in Computer Science (Italian-language)
- Bachelors in Psychological Science and Technique (Italian-language)

Degrees offered solely through Unitelma - Sapienza:

English-language Courses:

- Masters in Economy, Management and Innovation
- Training Course in Neonatology

Spanish-language Courses:

- Masters in Administración de Justicia - II Edition
- Master in Derechos humanos, política fiscal y crisis financiera global en Europa y América

Italian-language Courses:

- Bachelor of Science in Economics and Business Management
- Bachelors in Administration Sciences
- Master's degree in Law (five year program)
- Masters in Economics Management and Innovation
- Master of Science in Management of Public Administration and Health Organization

== Organization ==
=== Chancellor ===
Prof. Antonello Folco Biagini (Italian Wikipedia)

=== Rector ===
Prof. Francesco Avallone

== See also ==
- List of Italian universities
- Rome
- Distance education
