= Aosta Valley University =

University located in Aosta and Saint-Christophe, Italy

Coordinates: 45.7437°N 7.3189°E

University of Aosta Valley
- Università della Valle d'Aosta; Université de la Vallée d'Aoste
- Established: 2000
- Rector: Fabrizio Cassella
- Location: Aosta; Saint-Christophe, Italy
- Campus: Urban
- Website: www.univda.it

The University of Aosta Valley (Italian: Università della Valle d'Aosta, French: Université de la Vallée d'Aoste, UNIVDA) is a university located in Aosta and Saint-Christophe, Italy. It was founded in 2000.

== See also ==
- List of Italian universities
- Aosta Valley
