= Mercatorum University =

Independent private university in Rome

Coordinates: 41.8566°N 12.5212°E

- Università degli Studi delle Camere di Commercio Italiane Universitas Mercatorum (Italian)
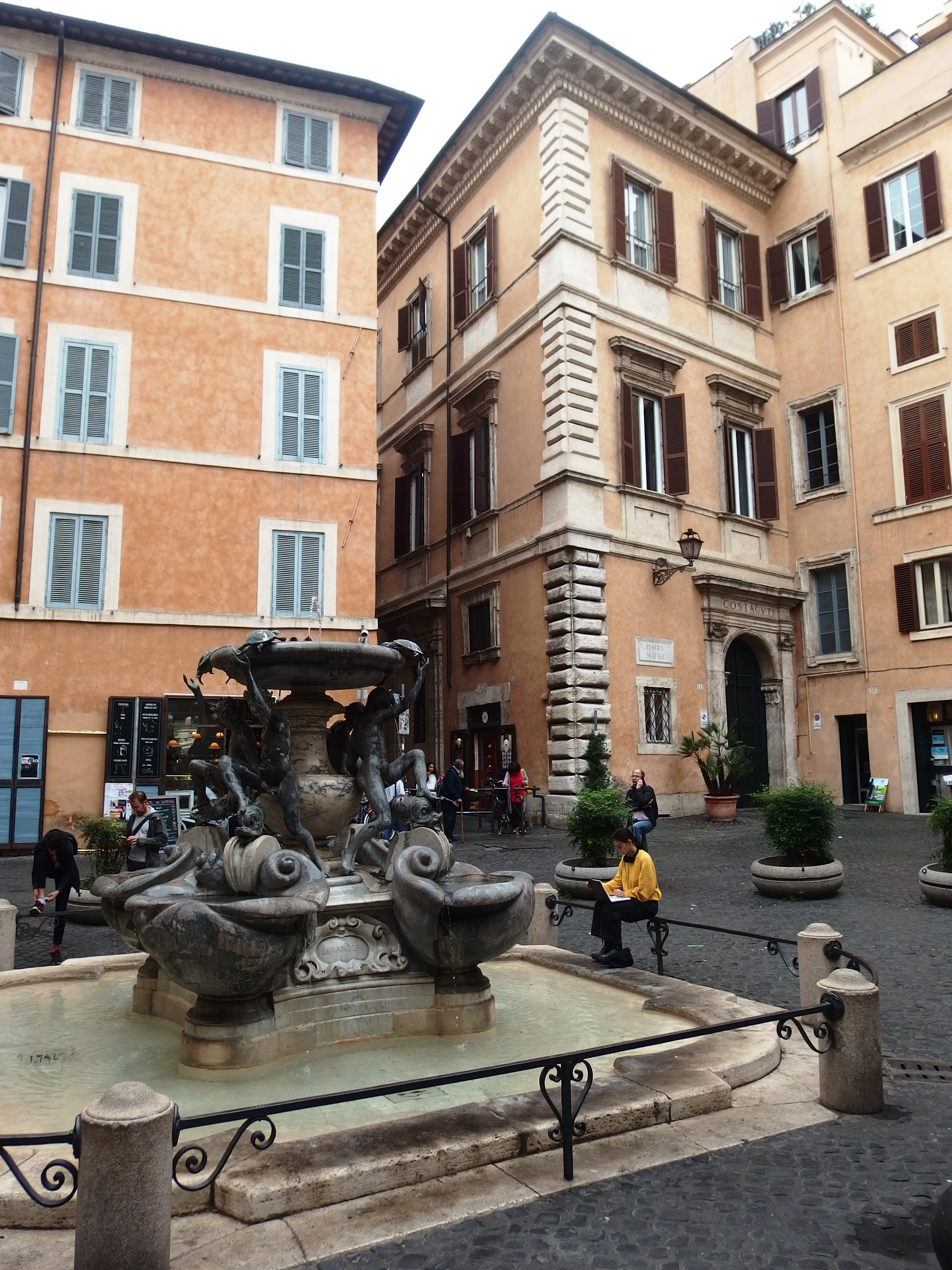
- Latin: Universitas Mercatorum
- Type: Private
- Established: 2006
- Affiliations: Camera di commercio, industria, artigianato e agricoltura
- President: Fabio Domenico Vaccarono
- Rector: Prof. Giovanni Cannata
- Students: 43,852
- Location: Piazza Mattei, 10, Rome, 00186, Italy
- Website: unimercatorum.it

Universitas Mercatorum (Italian: Università degli Studi delle Camere di Commercio Italiane Universitas Mercatorum, lit. 'University of the Italian Chambers of Commerce Universitas Mercatorum') is a private university located in Rome, Italy, founded in 2006 by the Italian Chambers of Commerce (i.e. Camera di commercio, industria, artigianato e agricoltura and Unioncamere).

== History ==
In Latin, Universitas Mercatorum means "university of commerce", which recalls the nature and the distinctive feature of the Italian chambers of commerce and their higher education system. It is accredited by the Ministerial Decree 10 May 2006, Italian Official Journal no. 134 on June 12, 2006.

The name Universitas Mercatorum evokes the origins, nature, and distinctive vocation of the Chambers of Commerce as representative bodies of the community and, more specifically, of the broad spectrum of productive sectors and stakeholders. The Universitas mercatorum mediolanensium were, in fact, associative bodies — forerunners of today’s Chambers of Commerce — that dispensed justice and exercised market regulation functions, safeguarding the interests of all involved sectors.

== Organization ==
The university is divided into the following three faculties:

- Faculty of Society and Communication Sciences
- Faculty of Economic and Legal Sciences
- Faculty of Technological Sciences and Innovation

It also offers postgraduate studies and courses, including several PhDs and the only Italian PhD in "Artificial Intelligence and Big data".

== Administration ==
=== Rectors ===
- Prof. Giorgio Marbach (2009-2014)
- Prof. Pierfrancesco Pacini (2014-2015)
- Prof. Giovanni Cannata (2015–present)

=== Presidents ===
- Fabio Domenico Vaccarono (2023–present)

== See also ==
- List of Italian universities
- Rome
