= National Centre for Distance Education =

French governmental agency for distance education

Coordinates: 46.6623°N 0.3612°E

Centre national d'enseignement à distance
- Type: Public
- Established: 1939
- Students: 350,000 (2022)
- Location: France
- Website: cned.fr

The National Centre for Distance Education (Centre national d'enseignement à distance or Cned in French) is a French public institution under the oversight of the Department of Education dedicated to providing distance learning material. It is the largest university in Europe by number of students.

It was created in 1939 and has been providing on-line material since the mid-1990s. The 3000 programs it offers range from kindergarten to university level. In 2022, about 350,000 students were registered, 30,000 living outside France. Of these, approximately 245,000 are higher education students ranging from polytechnic through to masters level. CNED offer the opportunity to study at a high level, while living in any country, or travelling around the globe. Students can study with books, or online (computer equipment used to study online is easier to carry when travelling).
