= List of largest universities =

The following is a list of largest universities in the world by country listing only the largest university in each country or independent territory. This is not a list of largest individual campuses with in-person (non-distance) enrollment. This list includes distance enrollment and multiple-campus institutions.

== List of countries ==
Country	University	Founded	Type	Enrollment	Ref
Albania	University of Tirana	1957	Public	35,000	
Algeria	Constantine University	1978	Public	85,000	
Angola	Agostinho Neto University	1962	Public	29,827	
Argentina	University of Buenos Aires	1821	Public	311,175	
Australia	Monash University	1958	Public	73,807	
Austria	University of Vienna	1365	Public	91,000	
Serbia	University of Belgrade	1808	Public	90,152	
Bangladesh	National University, Bangladesh	1992	Public	2,097,182	
Belarus	Belarusian State University	1921	Public	25,500	
Belgium	KU Leuven	1425	Private, state-funded	55,484	
Bosnia and Herzegovina	University of Sarajevo	1949	Public	30,866	
Botswana	University of Botswana	1982	Public	32,000	
Brazil	Estácio de Sá University	1970	Private	215,000	
Bulgaria	Sofia University	1888	Public	18,911	
Canada	University of Toronto	1827	Public	102,431	
China	Shanghai Open University	1960	Public	80,000	
Colombia	National University of Colombia	1867	Public	53,581	
Costa Rica	Universidad de Costa Rica	1940	Public	42,750	
Croatia	University of Zagreb	1669	Public	72,480	
Denmark	University of Copenhagen	1479	Public	36,600	
Dominican Republic	Universidad Autónoma de Santo Domingo	1538	Public	170,530	
Egypt	Ain Shams University	1950	Public	170,000	
Estonia	University of Tartu	1632	Public	14,000	
Finland	University of Helsinki	1640	Public	36,500	
France	Centre national d'enseignement à distance	1939	Public	350,000	
Germany	IU International University of Applied Sciences	1998	Private	130,000	
Greece	National and Kapodistrian University of Athens	1837	Public	104,000	
Guatemala	Universidad de San Carlos de Guatemala	1676	Public	124,000	
Hong Kong	Hong Kong Polytechnic University	1937	Public	32,000	
Iceland	University of Iceland	1911	Public	13,782	
India	Indira Gandhi National Open University	1985	Public	7,140,000	
Indonesia	Universitas Terbuka	1984	Public	1,045,665 (total) as per 2019/2020 311,028 (active) as per 4 November 2020	
Iran	Islamic Azad University	1982	Semi-private	1,000,000	
Ireland	University College Dublin	1834	Public (formerly private)	32,900	
Israel	Tel Aviv University	1956	Public	26,023	
Italy	Sapienza University of Rome	1303	Public	112,564	
Japan	Nihon University	1889	Private	70,667	
Kenya	University of Nairobi	1970	Public	84,000	
Kosovo	Universiteti i Prishtinës	1999	Public	41,833	
Lithuania	Vilnius University	1579	Public	23,606	
Macau	Macau University of Science and Technology	2000	Private	10,373	
Malaysia	Universiti Teknologi MARA	1956	Public	100,000	
Mexico	National Autonomous University of Mexico	1910	Public	349,515	
Nepal	Tribhuvan University	1959	Public	604,437	
Netherlands	Utrecht University	1636	Public	39,769	
New Zealand	University of Auckland	1883	Public	33,050	
North Macedonia	Ss. Cyril and Methodius University of Skopje	1943	Public	50,000	
Norway	Norwegian University of Science and Technology	1996	Public	39,000	
Pakistan	Allama Iqbal Open University	1974	Public	1,326,266	
Peru	National University of San Marcos	1551	Private	37,032	
Philippines	Polytechnic University of the Philippines	1907	Public	68,249	
Poland	University of Warsaw	1816	Public	44,400	
Portugal	University of Lisbon	1288	Public	48,100	
Romania	Spiru Haret University	1991	Private	311,928	
Russia	Modern University for the Humanities	1992	Private	200,000	
Saudi Arabia	King Abdulaziz University	1976	Public	177,234	
Singapore	National University of Singapore	1905	Public	38,300	
Slovenia	University of Ljubljana	1919	Public	48,821	
South Africa	University of South Africa	1873	Public	328,179	
South Korea	Korea National Open University	1972	Public	173,758	
Spain	National University of Distance Education	1972	Public	260,079	
Sweden	Lund University	1666	Public	30,646	
Switzerland	University of Zurich	1833	Public	26,356	
Taiwan	National Taiwan University	1928	Public	31,758	
Thailand	Ramkhamhaeng University	1971	Public	525,000	
Trinidad and Tobago	University of the West Indies	1960	Public	60,000+	
Turkey	Anadolu University	1958	Public	1,969,733	
United Kingdom	Open University	1969	Private, state-funded	253,075	
United States	Arizona State University	1885	Public	194,000	
Uruguay	University of the Republic	1949	Public	144,108	
Venezuela	Universidad Central de Venezuela	1721	Public	41,059	

== See also ==
- List of largest universities by enrollment
- List of the largest United States colleges and universities by enrollment
