= Partanna =

Partanna Parthénos (Greek)
- Comune
- Comune di Partanna
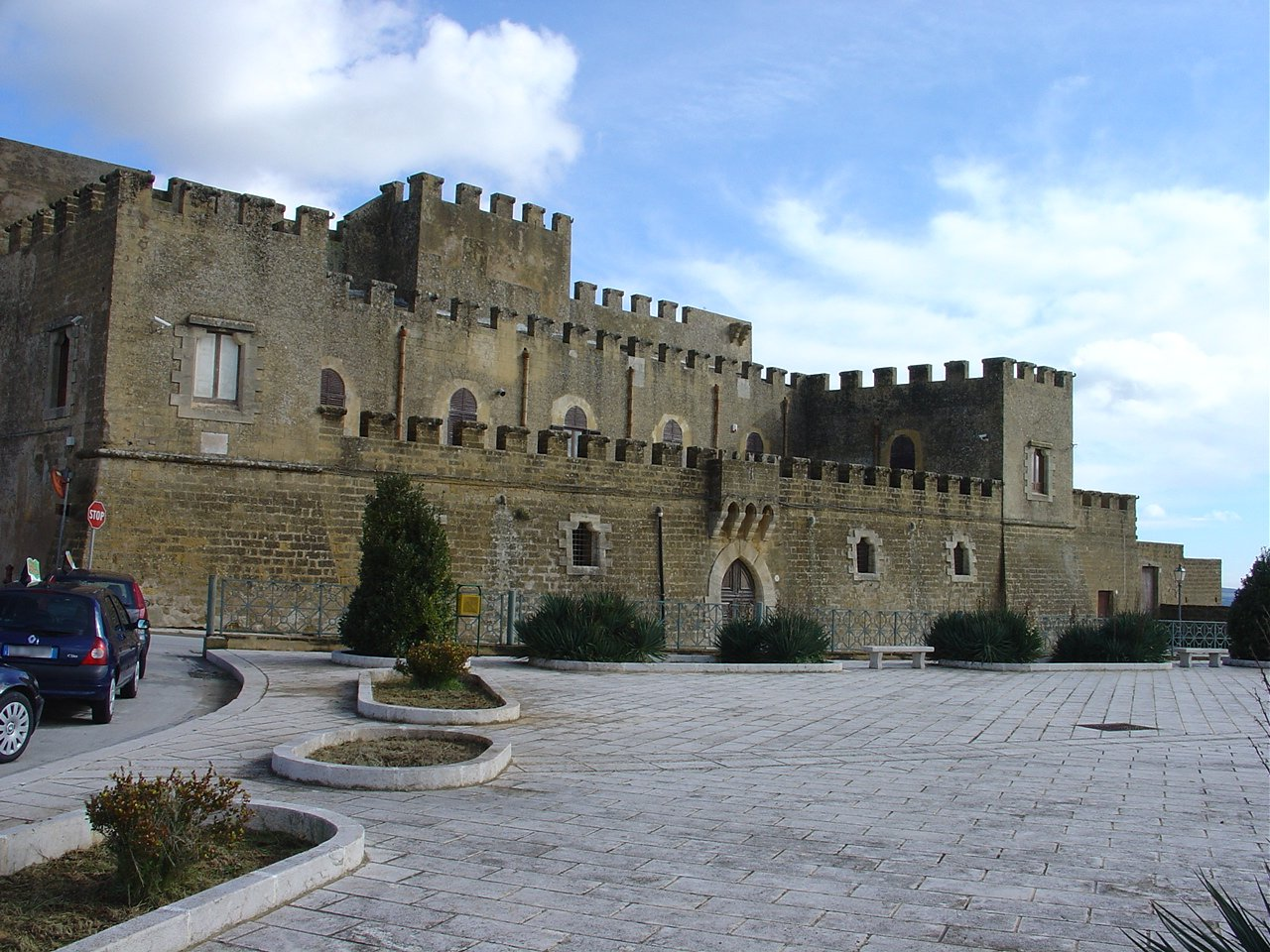

- Location within Italy Location within Sicily
- Coordinates: 37°43′N 12°53′E
- Country: Italy
- Region: Sicily
- Province: Trapani (TP)

Government
  - Mayor: Nicolò Catania

Area
  - Total: 82.73 km^{2} (31.94 sq mi)
- Elevation: 414 m (1,358 ft)

Population (31 December 2017)
  - Total: 10,422
  - Density: 126.0/km^{2} (326.3/sq mi)
- Demonym: Partannesi
- Time zone: UTC+1 (CET)
  - Summer (DST): UTC+2 (CEST)
- Postal code: 91028
- Dialing code: 0924
- Patron saint: St. Vitus
- Saint day: June 15
- Website: Official website

Partanna is a town and comune in province of Trapani, south-western Sicily, southern Italy. It is 58 kilometres (36 mi) south-east of Trapani.
