= Università degli Studi eCampus =

Coordinates: 45.6981°N 9.1185°E

eCampus University
- Università degli Studi eCampus
- Motto: Hic et nunc sapere aude
- Type: online private university
- Established: 2006
- Rector: Prof. Enzo Siviero
- Students: 8.010 a.y. 2015/16
- Location: Novedrate, Italy
- Website: www.uniecampus.it/

The eCampus University (Italian: Università degli Studi eCampus), often simply abbreviated as "Uni-eCampus" is a private accredited online university founded in 2006 in Novedrate, Italy.

The university was promoted by the "eCampus Foundation for universities and research", by Francesco Polidori, founder of the for-profit franchise chain CEPU (European centre for university preparation). Due to aggressive advertising, the Italian Data Protection Authority ordered the university to cease the abusive telemarketing practices in 2015.

== See also ==
- List of Italian universities
- Novedrate
- Distance education
