= List of University of Bologna people =

This is a list of some notable people affiliated with University of Bologna.

This is a dynamic list and may never be able to satisfy particular standards for completeness. You can help by adding missing items with reliable sources.

== Notable alumni ==
=== Academics ===
- Anna M. Borghi, Italian cognitive psychologist
- Umberto Eco, Italian semiotician, philosopher and writer
- Corrado Gini, Italian statistician, demographer and sociologist who developed the Gini coefficient
- Valerio Massimo Manfredi, Italian historian, writer, archaeologist and journalist

=== Clergy and Biblical scholars ===
- Archbishop Thomas Becket;
- Cardinal Alberto Bolognetti
- Cardinal Paolo Burali d'Arezzo;
- Pope Alexander VI
- Pope Gregory XIII (Ugo Boncompagni)
- Pope Gregory XV
- Pope Innocent IX
- Gabriele Paleotti
- Saint Charles Borromeo, archbishop of Milan
- Henry of Susa (Hostiensis)

=== Presidents, prime ministers, and other heads of national government ===
- Adone Zoli, former Prime Minister of Italy.
- Álvaro de Figueroa, former Prime Minister of Spain.
- Joaquín Chapaprieta, former Prime Minister of Spain.

=== Cabinet members ===
- Patrizio Bianchi, Minister of Public Education in the Draghi Cabinet
- Remo Gaspari, Minister of Relationships with the Parliament and Minister of Public Function in the Bettino Craxi and Giulio Andreotti Cabinet.
- Piero Gnudi, Minister of Tourism and Sports in the Monti cabinet.
- Juan Fernando López Aguilar, former Minister of Justice – Spain.
- Fawziya Abikar Nur, Minister for Health and Social Care – Somalia.

=== Senators, Representatives, and other politicians ===
- Brando Benifei, Italian politician
- Anna Maria Bernini, Italian politician and lawyer
- Pier Luigi Bersani, Italian politician
- Ernesto Carbone, Italian politician and lawyer
- Lanfranco De Franco, Italian politician and lawyer
- Maurizio Fugatti, Italian politician
- Edoardo Gaffeo, Italian politician
- Gian Luca Galletti, Italian politician
- Andrea Gnassi, Italian politician
- Sandro Gozi, Italian politician
- Matteo Lepore, Italian politician & mayor of Bologna
- Giacomo Matteotti
- Francesca Puglisi, Italian politician
- Giulia Sarti, Italian politician
- Elly Schlein, Italian politician
- Sandra Zampa, Italian politician
- Pablo Iglesias Turrión, Spain politician
- Pier Ferdinando Casini, Italian politician
- Gianni Cuperlo, Italian politician
- Virginio Merola, Italian politician & former mayor of Bologna
- Michelangelo Baracchi Bonvicini, President of Atomium - European Institute for Science, Media and Democracy.

=== Lawyers and judges ===
- Daria de Pretis, Italian jurist, Constitutional Judge of the Constitutional Court of Italy.
- Manuel Olivencia, lawyer and academic;
- Kristina Pardalos, Sammarinese jurist
- Bartolus de Saxoferrato, Italian law professor and one of the most prominent continental jurists of Medieval Roman Law.

=== Businessman & Economist ===
- Diego Della Valle, chairman of the Italian leather goods company Tod's
- Stefano Domenicali, CEO of Formula One Group and former CEO of Italian sports car manufacturer Automobili Lamborghini S.p.A.
- Raul Gardini, Italian agri-business and chemicals tycoon.
- Mauro Moretti, former CEO and general manager of Leonardo S.p.A.
- Elena Panaritis, Economist.
- Alberto Giovannini, Italian Macroeconomist and Financial Economist
- Fabrizio Zilibotti, Italian economist and Professor of International and Development Economics at Yale University

=== Nobel Prize winners ===
- Guglielmo Marconi, 1909 Nobel Prize in Physics and the inventor of radio.

=== Astronauts and Astronomer ===
- Andrea Boattini, Italian astronomer and a prolific discoverer of minor planets and comets.
- Isabella M. Gioia, Italian astrophysicist.

=== Engineers, inventors, and scientists ===
- Mauro Forghieri, Formula One racing car designer.
- Pier Luigi Nervi, Italian Structural engineer and architect.
- Ulisse Aldrovandi;
- Laura Bassi, the world's first woman to earn a university chair in a scientific field of studies
- Chryssostomos Chatgilialoglu, Greek-Italian chemist
- Nicolaus Copernicus, formulator of the heliocentric universal model;
- Enzo Ferrari, Italian racing driver, engineer and entrepreneur
- Luigi Galvani;
- Guglielmo Marconi, Italian inventor and radio pioneer
- Pietro Mengoli;
- Paracelsus, founder of the discipline of toxicology;
- Maria Matilde Principi, Entomology department chair for 30 years
- Augusto Righi, pioneer in the study of electromagnetism
- Carlo Rovelli, Italian theoretical physicist
- Carlo Severini, Italian mathematician
- Lazzaro Spallanzani, Italian priest, biologist and physiologist
- Luca Benini, computer scientist and educator
- Gregorio Ricci-Curbastro, Italian mathematician and the inventor of tensor calculus.
- Cristina Roccati, Italian physicist.
- Bruno Rossi, Italian experimental physicist.
- Juan Carlos Izpisua Belmonte, Spanish biochemist and developmental biologist.
- Enrico Marconi, Italian-Polish architect.
- Adamo Boari, Italian Art Nouveau and Art Deco civil engineer and architect.
- Cesare Emiliani, Italian-American scientist, geologist, micropaleontologist, and paleoceanography.

=== Physicians ===
- Julius Caesar Aranzi, the pioneer human anatomists and surgeons.
- Ruggero Oddi, Italian physiologist and anatomist.
- Marcello Malpighi;
- Gasparo Tagliacozzi, pioneer of plastic and reconstructive surgery
- Giovanni Aldini, Italian physician.
- Turisanus, physician.
- Taddeo Alderotti, Italian doctor and professor of medicine.
- Ismail Boçari, Albanian professor of medicine.
- Maria Dalle Donne, Italian physician and a former director at the University of Bologna.
- Giovanni Gasbarrini, physician, gastroenterology researcher and medical academic
- Hugo Spadafora, Italian and Panamanian physician.
- Justus Velsius, Dutch physician, and mathematician.

=== Entertainers ===
- Michelangelo Antonioni;
- Carlo Goldoni, Italian playwright
- Emilio Solfrizzi, Italian actor and comedian.

=== Authors and artists ===
- Dante Alighieri, Italian poet, writer and philosopher
- Leon Battista Alberti;
- Silvia Balducci, Italian journalist at RAI
- Rosetta Berardi, Italian painter, sculptor, and artist.
- Pico della Mirandola;
- Maria Cristina Didero, Italian curator, historian, and author
- Albrecht Dürer, German painter, printmaker and theorist
- Erasmus of Rotterdam
- Milena Gabanelli, Italian journalist and television host
- Riccardo Iacona, Italian journalist
- Carlo Lucarelli
- Giovanni Pascoli
- Pier Paolo Pasolini;
- Petrarch;
- Pupi Avati, Italian film director, producer, and screenwriter.
- Carlo Mazzacurati, Italian film director and screenwriter
- Luca Rosini, Italian journalist
- Torquato Tasso;
- Silvia Avallone, Italian novelist and poet.
- Chiara Gamberale, Italian writer, television and radio presenter.
- Vittorio Sgarbi, Italian art critic, art historian and writer.
- Andrea Pazienza, Italian comics artist and painter.

=== Other notables ===
- Irnerius, founder of the School of Glossators
- Veronica Yoko Plebani, Italian Paralympic athlete.
- Pierluigi Collina, Chairman of the FIFA referees committee

=== Philosopher ===
- Francesco Algarotti, Italian Philosopher, poet, art critic and art collector.
- Francesco Maria Zanotti, Italian philosopher and writer.

== Notable faculty ==
- Maria Gaetana Agnesi
- Leon Battista Alberti
- Ulisse Aldrovandi
- Camillo Baldi
- Augusto Barbera
- Hamida Barmaki
- Laura Bassi
- Pier Cesare Bori
- Bulgarus
- Gualtiero Calboli
- Gabriella Campadelli-Fiume
- Girolamo Cardano
- Giosuè Carducci
- Giovanni Cassini
- Manuel Chrysoloras
- Giacomo Ciamician
- Nicolaus Copernicus
- Ignazio Danti
- Lippo Bartolomeo Dardi
- Giovanni Della Casa
- Giovanni de' Marignolli
- Ivano Dionigi
- Yuriy Drohobych (also known as Georgius de Drohobycz)
- Albrecht Dürer
- Umberto Eco
- Luigi Galvani
- Carlo Goldoni
- Bettisia Gozzadini
- Sylvester Gozzolini
- Gratian
- Guido Guinizelli
- Henry of Susa (Hostiensis)
- Irnerius
- Beppo Levi
- Girolamo Maggi
- Giovanni Antonio Magini
- Marcello Malpighi
- Virgilio Malvezzi
- Martinus Gosia
- Pietro Mengoli
- Niall Ó Glacáin
- Patriarch Heraclius of Jerusalem
- Paracelsus
- Giovanni Pascoli
- Pier Paolo Pasolini
- Paul, Dominican martyr
- Francesco Petrarca (also known as Petrarch)
- Giovanni Pico della Mirandola
- Romano Prodi
- Augusto Righi
- Pellegrino Rossi
- William of Saliceto
- Coluccio Salutati
- Benvenutus Scotivoli
- Francesco Selmi
- William of Tyre
- Özalp Babaoğlu
