= Anna Borghi =

Cognitive psychologist

- Citizenship: Italian
- Occupation: Associate Professor of Psychology

Academic background
- Education: University of Bologna

Anna M. Borghi is a cognitive psychologist known for her work on embodied cognition and embodied language comprehension. She is Professor of Psychology at the Sapienza University of Rome and an associate researcher at the Institute of Cognitive Sciences and Technology, Italian Research Council. Borghi has served as Specialty Chief Editor of Frontiers in Psychology (area: Theoretical and Philosophical Psychology).

== Biography ==
Borghi received her Laurea in Philosophy in 1987 and her PhD in Experimental Psychology in 1997 from the University of Bologna. Her dissertation was titled Struttura e funzione nella concettualizzazione: il ruolo della percezione, del linguaggio e della conoscenza [Structure and function in categorization: the role of perception, language and knowledge]. Much of Borghi's early work was focused on how conceptual categories are structured, with her later work centering around embodied cognition.

After her PhD work, she completed a post doctorate fellowship and collaborated with Laurence Barsalou at Emory University, and subsequently with Arthur M. Glenberg at the University of Wisconsin-Madison. The collaboration with Glenberg resulted in well cited paper "Putting Words in Perspective", where the authors presented evidence that there was a link between conceptual knowledge and action.

== Research ==
Borghi's research investigates how language and concepts are grounded in bodily states and motor systems. Specifically, Borghi has focused on the role that affordance perception has in language comprehension and conceptualization. Borghi has also explored how affordances are more generally processed by the human visual system, and has argued that affordances should be understood as sensorimotor representations of possible actions one can take towards an object.

Borghi and her collaborators are responsible for the Words as Social Tools hypothesis, which claims that language serves as a tool to develop abstract concepts. This hypothesis emphasizes the social nature of concepts and argues for specific neural correlates for abstract concepts, such as areas associated with social cognition and motor areas representing the mouth. The Words as Social Tools hypothesis has received praise from some researchers for recognizing the role of language in cognition and the social role of abstract concepts, but has received criticism for some specific components of the theory, such as the role of mouth motor representations, and the underutilization of the mirror neuron system.

== Books ==
- Borghi, Anna M., Binkofski, F. (2014). Words as social tools: an embodied view applied to abstract concepts. New York. ISBN 978-1-4614-9539-0. OCLC. 873949348.
- Borghi, Anna M. (2023). The Freedom of Words: Abstractness and the Power of Language. Cambridge University Press. doi: 10.1017/9781108913294.

== Representative papers ==
- Borghi, A. M. & Cimatti, F. (2010). "Embodied cognition and beyond: Acting and sensing the body". Neuropsychologia. 48 (3): 763–773.
- Borghi, A. M., Glenberg, A. M., Kaschak, M. P. (2004). "Putting words in perspective". Memory & Cognition. 32 (6): 863–873.
- Borghi, A.M. & Riggio, L. (2009). "Sentence comprehension and simulation of object temporary, canonical and stable affordances". Brain Research. 1253: 117–128.
- Borghi, A. M., Mazzuca, C., & Tummolini, L. (2025). The role of social interaction in the formation and use of abstract concepts. Nature Reviews Psychology, 4(7), 470-483.
