= Arthur M. Glenberg =

American cognitive psychologist

Arthur Glenberg
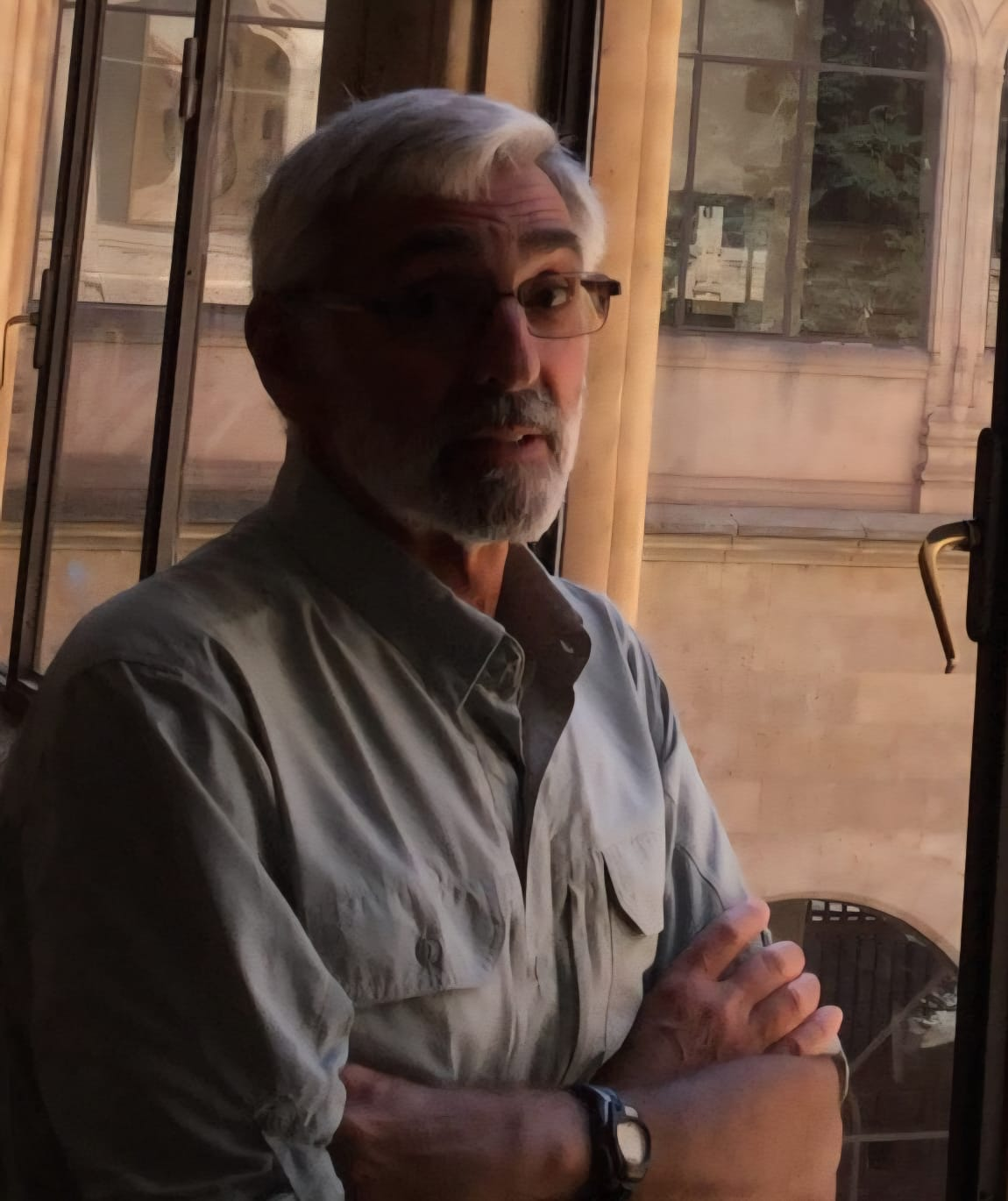
- Born: Arthur M. Glenberg; United States
- Occupation: Cognitive psychologist
- Known for: Embodied cognition; Indexical Hypothesis

Academic background
- Education: Miami University (BA); University of Michigan (PhD)
- Doctoral advisor: Arthur Melton

Academic work
- Discipline: Psychology
- Sub-discipline: Cognitive psychology, Embodied cognition
- Institutions: University of Wisconsin–Madison; Arizona State University

Arthur M. Glenberg is an American cognitive psychologist and Professor Emeritus at Arizona State University (ASU) and the University of Wisconsin–Madison. He is best known for his work in embodied cognition, specifically his development of the "Indexical Hypothesis".

== Education ==
Glenberg earned his Bachelor of Arts in Psychology from Miami University in 1970. He proceeded to the University of Michigan, where he completed his PhD in Experimental Psychology in 1974.

== Career ==
Glenberg began his academic career at the University of Wisconsin–Madison in 1974, where he was appointed Assistant Professor of Psychology. He was promoted to Associate Professor in 1980 and to full Professor in 1986, a position he held until 2007.

In 2008, Glenberg joined Arizona State University as Professor of Psychology. He remained at ASU until his retirement in 2020. He also served as a Senior Learning Scientist at the ASU Learning Sciences Institute.

In 2019, Glenberg and colleague Erin Lanphier established the ENERGIZE Initiative at the Arizona State University Department of Psychology. The initiative aims to support underrepresented psychology majors by facilitating their placement in research laboratories.

== Awards and honors ==
- Fellow of the Society for Text and Discourse
- Fellow of the Association for Psychological Science
- Fellow of the Society of Experimental Psychologists
- In 2007, he received the Chancellor’s Distinguished Teaching Award from the University of Wisconsin–Madison
- During the 2016–2017 academic year, he was named Investigador Distinguido by the University of Salamanca
- In 2020, he received the Samuel Leifheit Award from Arizona State University
- From 2021 to 2023, he served as a Mercator Fellow at the University of Tübingen
- In May 2023, he received the Professor of Impact Award from Arizona State University
- In 2025, he was awarded the Distinguished Scientific Contribution Award by the Society for Text and Discourse

== Books ==
- Glenberg, A. M. (1988). Learning from Data: An Introduction to Statistical Reasoning. San Diego, California: Harcourt Brace Jovanovich.
- Harris, B., & Glenberg, A. M. (1988). Instructor’s Manual to Accompany Glenberg’s Learning from Data. San Diego, California: Harcourt Brace Jovanovich.
- Glenberg, A. M. (1996). Learning from Data: An Introduction to Statistical Reasoning (2nd ed.). Mahwah, New Jersey: Lawrence Erlbaum Associates.
- Glenberg, A. M., & Andrzejewski, M. (2007). Learning from Data: An Introduction to Statistical Reasoning (3rd ed.). New York City: Routledge.
- de Vega, M., Glenberg, A. M., & Graesser, A. C. (2008). Symbols, Embodiment and Meaning. Oxford, United Kingdom: Oxford University Press.
- Glenberg, A. M., & Andrzejewski, M. E. (2024). Learning from Data: An Introduction to Statistical Reasoning Using JASP (4th ed.). London: Routledge. doi:10.4324/9781003025405
