= Michelangelo Baracchi Bonvicini =

Italian writer

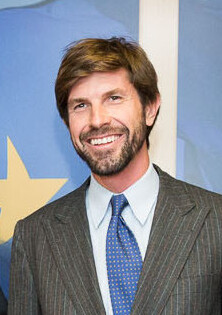
Michelangelo Baracchi Bonvicini, in 2016.

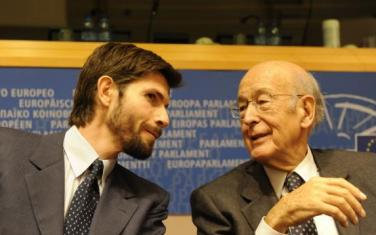
Michelangelo Baracchi Bonvicini (left) with Valéry Giscard d'Estaing

Michelangelo Baracchi Bonvicini has launched in 2009 the Atomium - European Institute for Science, Media and Democracy with the former French President Valéry Giscard d'Estaing at the European Parliament. He is currently President of AI4People Institute.

== Early life ==
Baracchi Bonvicini was born in London and grew up in Italy, where he completed his studies at the University of Bologna attaining a bachelors in History.

He began in 1999 as a war correspondent in Kosovo, Albania and Montenegro for the Italian editorial group Quotidiano Nazionale.

In 2002 he covered the second Intifada reporting from Israel and Palestine. In 2003 he worked for the Italian newspaper Libero from Afghanistan, Pakistan and Iran, following the US invasion of Afghanistan. In that same year he published Sognando Gerusalemme resulting from his reporting from Israel and Palestine in 2002.

== Career ==
With Valéry Giscard d'Estaing, Baracchi Bonvicini founded the Atomium - European Institute for Science and Democracy in November 2009 at the European Parliament in Brussels.

In 2011, Baracchi Bonvicini and Giscard d'Estaing received the medal "Plus Ratio Quam Vis" from the Polish university Jagiellonian University for "their contribution to the European academic community by founding the institute".

In September 2012, during the negotiations regarding the EU budget for 2014–2020, Baracchi Bonvicini and Giscard d'Estaing together with the former Prime Minister of Spain Felipe González Márquez, jointly signed the letter "For a European Consciousness, For a More Competitive Europe", asking EU member states to increase the budget for research and innovation. The letter was sent to all European prime ministers and head of governments.

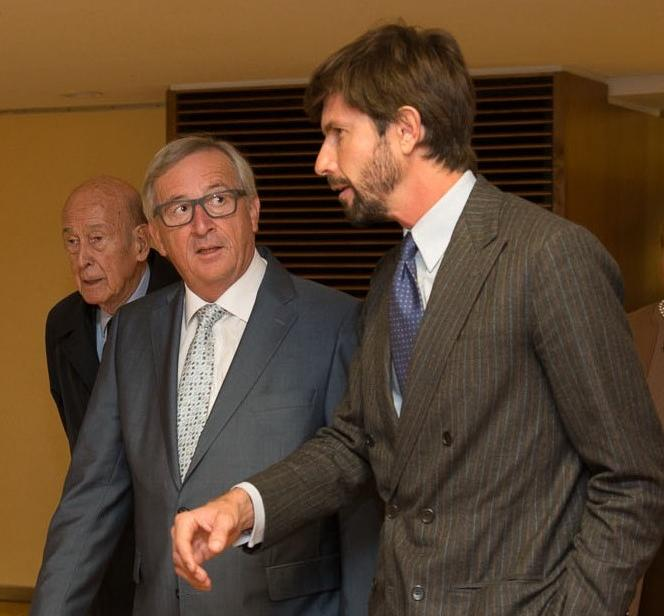
Michelangelo Baracchi Bonvicini and Jean-Claude Juncker, President of the European Commission

In 2016, Baracchi Bonvicini promoted together with Massimo Marchiori the set-up of REIsearch, a non-profit initiative co-funded by the European Commission, Nokia, Elsevier, and other Atomium partners. Its aim is to connect researchers and policy makers on topics linked to scientific research, in order to promote evidence-based policy making. REIsearch has focused on chronic diseases, next generation internet and digital skills.

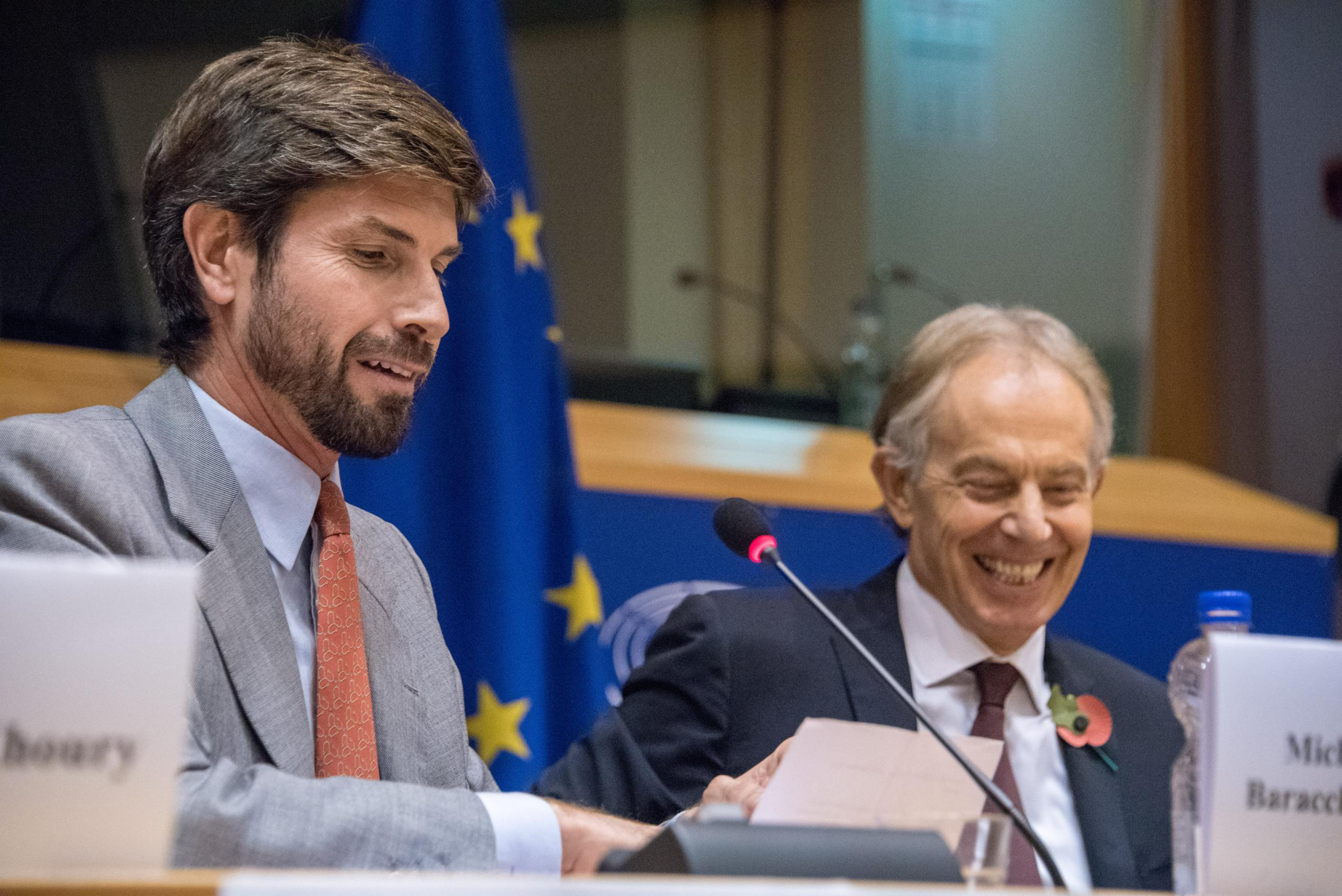
Michelangelo Baracchi Bonvicini and Tony Blair at the European Parliament in November 2018 for the presentation of the "AI4 People's Ethical Framework for a good AI Society"

In 2018 Michelangelo Baracchi Bonvicini and the philosopher Luciano Floridi have launched AI4People Institute, to shape the debate on AI Ethics in the European Union.

In November 2018 with Tony Blair he presented at the European Parliament the "AI4People's Ethical Framework for a Good AI Society”. The report is at the origins of the regulatory process that led to the Al Act in the European Union, the world's first Al regulation.

In May 2023 Baracchi Bonvicini, Luciano Floridi and Robert Madelin (former General Director of the DG Connect to the European Commission) have founded AI4People Ltd as a spin-off of AI4People Institute. AI4People Ltd provides AI risk assessment consultancy services. At the beginning of 2025 AI4People Ltd announced the upcoming launch of a platform for AI adoption, assessment and compliance.
