= Gabriella Campadelli-Fiume =

Italian virologist

- Born: Bologna, Italy
- Citizenship: Italian
- Education: University of Bologna (Sc.D.)
- Known for: Discovery of nectin-1 as the entry receptor for HSV; Discovery of the gD "pro-fusion" domain Pioneering fully-retargeted HER2 oncolytic herpesviruses (oHSVs)
- Spouse: Luigi Fiume
- Children: 2
- Awards: Fellowship in the American Academy of Microbiology (2011); Accademia Nazionale dei Lincei Award; FEMS Pathogens and Disease Editorial Board
- Scientific career
- Fields: Virology, Oncology, Microbiology
- Workplaces: University of Bologna
- Doctoral advisor: Maurizio Terni
- Other academic advisors: Bernard Roizman

Gabriella Campadelli-Fiume is an Italian virologist with a primary research focus on herpes simplex virus, fusion and viral entry. She is a retired professor of virology from the University of Bologna.

== Education ==
Gabriella Campadelli-Fiume completed her doctorate of science (Sc.D.) at the University of Bologna]. Her specialization in virology was also completed at the University of Bologna.

== Career ==
Campadelli-Fiume primarily researches Herpes simplex virus (HSV), particularly how it enters, assembles, and exits the cell during an infection. In addition, she is interested in how HSV is induced to enter the exocytic pathway.

Campadelli-Fiume is a founding member and executive board member of the European Society for Virology, and a founding member of both the European Academy of Microbiology and the Italian Society of Virology. She has served on the European Research Council, DGXII Health Commissions, and as a member of the Health Research Committee for the Italian Ministry of Health from 2000-2006.

== Research ==
Campadelli-Fiume's research primarily focuses on the entry mechanisms of both Herpes simplex virus 1 (HSV-1) and Herpes simplex virus 2 (HSV-2). Her work on these Group I double-stranded DNA viruses has centered on how they interact with host cell receptors to initiate infection. Specifically, her laboratory investigated the roles of specific viral glycoproteins, such as gD, gB, and the gH/gL complex—which are highly conserved across the Alphaherpesvirinae subfamily and serve as the core machinery for viral entry and cell-to-cell fusion.

Campadelli-Fiume's discovered that nectin is the host cell receptor for HSV. She also discovered the triggering activity of receptor- bound gD. In addition to these major discoveries, she identified the gF profusion domain, which provided the first evidence that retargeted HSVs exert anti-tumor activity.

Campadelli-Fiume took part in a study showing that glycoproteins gD, gB, and gH/gL permit herpes virus to enter cells and were involved in fusion. Their research indicated that gD is not required for the interactions between the glycoproteins gB and gH/gL. Rather, their interactions are made possible due to the multiple sites carried by gB. The multiple sites of gB can be found in the pleckstrin-domain that carries the bipartite fusion loop, and interaction with gH/gL can take place successfully without gD.

== Writing ==
As the author of an overall encyclopedic of basic virology and clinical manifestations, Human Herpesviruses, her work has been included in the University of Pennsylvania's 2007 Celebration of Women Writers. She has gained recent attention for laudable women in science by the International Society of Antiviral Research (ISAR) that has featured her as a prominent woman scientist. The American Academy of Microbiology awarded recognition of her scientific achievement and her contributions to advanced microbiology.

Campadelli-Fiume has been an editorial board member for the Journal of Virology since 2005, and as an editorial board member and for the Federation of European Microbiological Societies (FEMS) of Pathogens and Disease since 2013. She serves on the International Advisory Board for The Lancet.

=== Awards ===
- Pasteur Institute, Athens 1997
- Accademia Nazionale dei Lincei, 2002
- Fellowship in the American Academy of Microbiology

== Selected publications ==
- Ichikawa K, Hughes IA, Horwitz AL, DeGroot LJ (1987). "Characterization of nuclear thyroid hormone receptors of cultured skin fibroblasts from patients with resistance to thyroid hormone". Metab. Clin. Exp. 36 (4): 392–9. doi:10.1016/0026-0495(87)90214-9. PMID 3561254.
- Singh GN, Gupta RP, Prakash P (1988). "Effect of ionic strength on the stability of norfloxacin". Pharmazie. 43 (2): 134. PMID 3393584.
- Chong YH, Soh CC (1966). "The protein nutritive quality of ikan bilis (Stolephorus spp.)". Med J Malaya. 20 (3): 230–3. PMID 4223072.
- Leonard, Fred (1989). "Butorphanol versus morphine: equally ineffective when given incorrectly". Ann Emerg Med. 18 (5): 603–5. doi:10.1016/s0196-0644(89)80869-8. PMID 2719377.
- Zora JA, Lutz CN, Tinkelman DG (1989). "Assessment of compliance in children using inhaled beta adrenergic agonists". Ann Allergy. 62 (5): 406–9. PMID 2566291.
- Leonard, Fred (1989). "Butorphanol versus morphine: equally ineffective when given incorrectly". Ann Emerg Med. 18 (5): 603–5. doi:10.1016/s0196-0644(89)80869-8. PMID 2719377.
- Mihalik SJ, Rhead WJ (1991). "Species variation in organellar location and activity of L-pipecolic acid oxidation in mammals". J. Comp. Physiol. B. 160 (6): 671–6. doi:10.1007/bf00571266. PMID 2045546. S2CID 35457957.
- Ryan LM, Kurup IV, Derfus BA, Kushnaryov VM (1992). "ATP-induced chondrocalcinosis". Arthritis Rheum. 35 (12): 1520–5. doi:10.1002/art.1780351216. PMID 1472129.
- MacLeod SP, MacIntyre DR (1992). "Case report: calcification of genioglossus: a painful radiographic finding". Clin Radiol. 46 (2): 137–8. doi:10.1016/s0009-9260(05)80322-8. PMID 1395405.
- Eberhardt KE, Thimm BM, Spring A, Maskos WR (1992). "Dose-dependent rate of nosocomial pulmonary infection in mechanically ventilated patients with brain oedema receiving barbiturates: a prospective case study". Infection. 20 (1): 12–8. doi:10.1007/bf01704886. PMID 1563806. S2CID 1210701.
- De Castro Barbosa F, Agüera L, Rosell D, Isa W, Sánchez de la Muela P, Robles JE, Bergera JJ, Berián JM (1992). "[Retroperitoneal ganglioneuroma: an infrequent tumor]". Actas Urol Esp (in Spanish). 16 (9): 736–8. PMID 1488928.
- Menon PK, Rajagopalan PK (1979). "Seasonal changes in the density and natural mortality of immature stages of the urban malaria vector, Anopheles stephensi (Liston) in wells in Pondicherry". Indian J. Med. Res. 70 Suppl: 123–7. PMID 548475.
- Chen TR (1979). "Cytogenetics of somatic cell hybrids. I. Progression of stemlines in continuous uncloned cultures of man-mouse cell hybrids". Cytogenet. Cell Genet. 23 (4): 221–30. doi:10.1159/000131332. PMID 446093.
- Weimann S, Scharfetter H, Riedler L (1979). "[Esophageal tuberculosis]". Zentralbl Chir (in German). 104 (16): 1072–6. PMID 525084.
- Hussain S, Ehrenberg L (1979). "Mutagenicity of radiations at low doses". Hereditas. 91 (1): 111–5. doi:10.1111/j.1601-5223.1979.tb01649.x. PMID 387673.
