= Arthur Melton =

American experimental psychologist, researcher, and professor

Arthur Weever Melton (August 13, 1906 – November 5, 1978) was an American experimental psychologist, researcher, and professor. He served as the editor of the Journal of Experimental Psychology for twelve years.

== Background ==
Arthur "Art" Weever Melton was born in Fayetteville, Arkansas, on August 13, 1906. At 18 years old, he began undergraduate studies in Psychology at Washington University in St. Louis where he worked with John A. McGeoch, a functionalist, who performed studies exploring how the distribution of practice, rest, and interpolated learning affects the formation and loss of association. Melton received a BA in psychology in 1928. He went on to graduate school at Yale University under the mentorship of Edward S. Robinson, another functionalist, whose research focused on verbal learning. Melton obtained his PhD in experimental psychology.in 1932.

== Career ==
=== Museum research ===
After receiving his PhD, Melton stayed at Yale as an instructor for three years. During this time, he worked on a project with Robinson at the Philadelphia Museum of Art & Buffalo Museum of Science which was funded by the Carnegie Corporation and the American Association of Museums. He published two important monographs: Problems of Installation in Museums of Art (1935 ) and Experimental Studies of the Education of Children in a Museum of Science (1936). Melton examined the influence of variables such as the spacing of an art piece in a display on subsequent interest in the piece by museum visitors, by quantifying the amount of time spent looking at a specific piece of art and the total number of pieces observed.

=== University of Missouri ===
In 1935, Melton obtained a position as the chairman of the Department of Psychology at the University of Missouri Under Melton's leadership, the department established a highly regarded, nationally recognized and rigorous master's degree program that ensured automatic admission to a PhD program at any university upon completion. Further, Melton established a five-credit-hour, lecture-laboratory introductory psychology course, that was adopted as an option in the science requirement of the college, although with resistance from other basic science departments. These advances solidified Melton's reputation as an administrator.

During this time, Melton began his lifelong research on human learning and memory using a functional approach. He combined this functional approach with process ideas to show the mental operations that are not directly observable. He published two seminal pieces, one with Jean McQueen Irwin (1940) on interpolated learning and with W. J. von Lackum (1941) on the two-factor theory of retroactive interference. Melton and Irwin had subjects learn a word list of associated words, then recall the words after varying numbers of trials on a second word list. They subtracted the number of overt intrusions (newly learned words from list two) from the total amount of retroactive interference (the amount of interference of memory for list one words as a function of the number of trials of list two). They found a phenomenon, which they called Factor X, that was large and systematically increased with the amount of interpolated learning of list two. They found that, at low levels of list one learning, the interference was largely due to overt intrusions, but with increased learning of list one, interference appeared be due to factor X. Over time, the number of intrusion errors decreased. They postulated that this was similar to the unlearning of an association suggested by Clark L. Hull during extinction. They suggested that errors in memory, forgetting, are a result of commission and omissions errors due to new learning. Factor X was responsible for the weakening or unlearning of first-list association during the learning of an interpolated list. With these papers, Melton extended prior work to show that forgetting was due to both response competition and unlearning, which was dubbed the two-factor theory of retroactive interference. Notably, the use of subtraction methods to reveal underlying processes would become a prominent method in studies of short-term memory and cognition after World War II.

=== Aviation psychology ===
During World war II, Melton like many psychologists joined the military. Melton spent the next 17 years in military psychology. He helped develop a battery of psychomotor tests, assessing perceptual-motor coordination and related factors necessary for flying, for pilot selection in the air force. The success of these tests was important to the prestige of experimental psychology in the military. Melton would later publish a monograph on these test batteries. Melton's leadership helped create and solidify an important role for psychology within the military, especially the training of psychologists who became leaders in experimental psychology after the war. Melton served as the Technical Director of the Air Force Personnel and Training Research Center at Lackland Air Force Base in Texas and rose to the rank of brigadier general during his time in the military.

=== University of Michigan ===
Melton returned to academia in 1957 joining the Department of Psychology at the University of Michigan. He and Paul Fitts established the Human Performance Center which became one of the leading research and training centers for experimental psychologists. At Michigan, Melton continued his work on verbal learning and memory. In fact, Melton became a leading authority on memory across the world. His paper "Implications of Short-Term Memory for a General Theory of Memory" (1963) was a landmark. Melton argued for the continuity of short-term and long-term memory, which is consistent with modern theories of memory, rather than the presiding theoretical framework at the time that they were structurally distinct. Melton reported that if a subject was given a free-recall list with words occurring twice, the probability of recall of repeated words was directly defined by the lag, the number of items that fall between the identical words, the Melton lag effect.

=== Service ===
In 1951, Melton was appointed editor of the Journal of Experimental Psychology, which he held for 12 years. He became a member of the American Psychological Association's (APA) Board of Directors from 1952 to 1954 & 1962–1965, and chairman of the Board of Scientific Affairs from 1957–1958, member of the Policy and Planning Board from 1962 to 1965. Melton was on the APA Publications Board from 1957–1960 and the Communications Committee from 1970-1974. He was a founding member of the Psychonomic Society and served on its governing board from 1968 to 1973. He served as president of the Midwestern Psychological Association, the APA Division of Experimental Psychology and Division of Military Psychology.

== Later life ==
Melton stayed at the University of Michigan until his retirement in 1974 and became a visiting professor at the University of Texas at Austin, where he taught part-time. Towards the end of his life, Melton suffered from debilitating health problems that severely decreased his vision. He died on November 5, 1978, in San Antonio, Texas, at the age of 72.

== Legacy ==
In an article written for the American Psychological Foundation Awards in 1976, Melton was described as " a leader in the experimental study of human learning, whose theoretical insights and systematic analyses have profoundly influenced the direction of research." Melton seminal paper on short- and long-term memory was cited 15 times within a year of being published, this number rose to 296 citations over the following 10 years. This influential paper is still highly regarded with 296 citation in the past 10 years. Although, Melton was known for this research on verbal learning, his work in museum research is enduring. His research on museums continues to be cited in new papers on museum education and organization.

=== Impact of works ===
Publication	Title	Times Cited	Type
McGeoch & Melton (1929)	The comparative retention values of maze habits and of nonsense syllables.	38	Manuscript
Melton (1935)	Problems of Installation in Museums of Art	192	Monograph
Melton (1936)	Experimental Studies of the Education of Children in a Museum of Science	59	Monograph
Melton (1936)	The Methodology of Experimental Studies of Human Learning and Retention	41	Manuscript
Melton & Irwin (1940)	The influence of degree of interpolated learning on retroactive inhibition and the overt transfer of specific responses	448	Manuscript
Melton & Von Lackum (1941)	Retroactive and proactive inhibition in retention: evidence for a two-factor theory of retroactive inhibition	169	Manuscript
Melton (1947)	Apparatus Tests	207	Monograph
Melton (1963)	Implications of short-term memory for a general theory of memory	877	Manuscript
Fitts & Melton (1964)	Perceptual-motor skill learning	1308	Manuscript
Postman & Melton (1964)	Short-term memory and incidental learning	359	Manuscript
Melton (1964- First printing)	Categories of Human Learning	170	Book
Melton (1970)	The situation with respect to the spacing of repetitions and memory	473	Manuscript
Melton & Martin (1972)	Coding processes in human memory	175	Manuscript

=== Award and honors ===
- Election to the National Academy of Sciences (1969)
- Gold Medal of the American Psychological Foundation (1976)
