= Isabella M. Gioia =

Italian astrophysicist

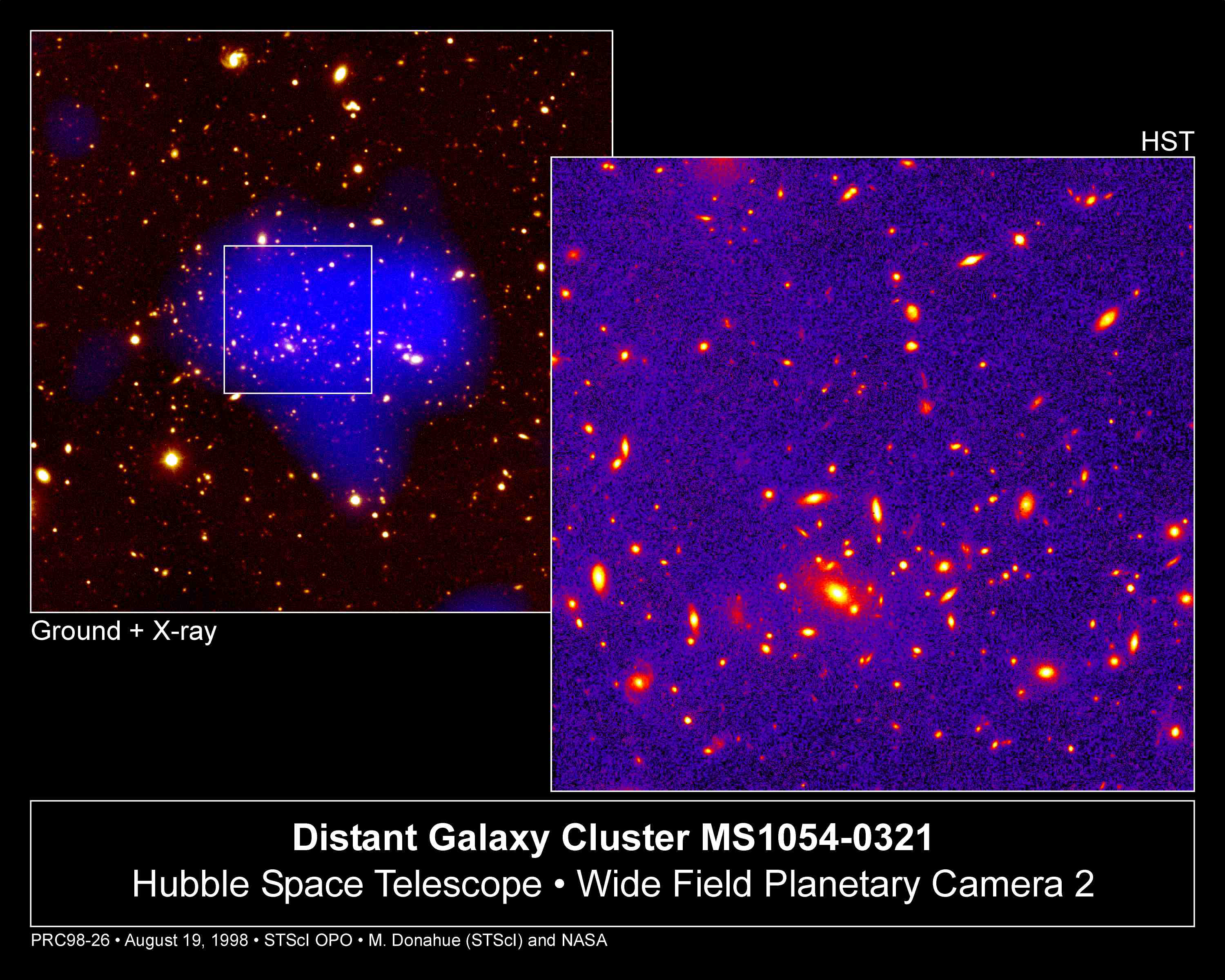
- Image co-authored by Isabella M. Gioia while at University of Hawaii Institute for Astronomy. Views of Galaxy Cluster MS1054-0321 From Ground and X-Ray Observatories (left) and Hubble (right)
- Education: University of Bologna (Ph.D.)
- Known for: Astrophysics
- Scientific career
- Fields: Astrophysics
- Workplaces: National Institute for Astrophysics
- Thesis: The Radio Emission of Bright Galaxies

Isabella M. Gioia is an Italian astrophysicist. She is currently a Research Associate at INAF in Bologna, Italy.

== Career ==
While a visiting astronomer at the University of Hawaii Institute for Astronomy, she was a member of the Chandra Science Center. As of 2012, she had been a member of the American Astronomical Society for 25 years. She was included in the 1996-1997 edition of Who's Who in Science and Engineering. She was listed in ISI's 1120 World's Most Cited Physicists (1981–1997) with 65 articles, 2397 citations, and an average of 36.88 citations per article as of the time of publication.
