= Chryssostomos Chatgilialoglu =

Greek-Italian chemist

Chryssostomos Chatgilialoglu (Greek: Χρυσόστομος Χατζηλιάλογλου) is a Greek-Italian chemist, whose work has mainly focused on free radical reactions. His parents Christos and Penelope were ethnic Greeks from Asia Minor. He was born in 1952 in Nikaia Greece, where he grew up and went to school until the age of 18. He is currently President of the company Lipinutragen and associated with the National Research Council (CNR) of Italy in Bologna and Adam Mickiewicz University, Poznań, Poland.

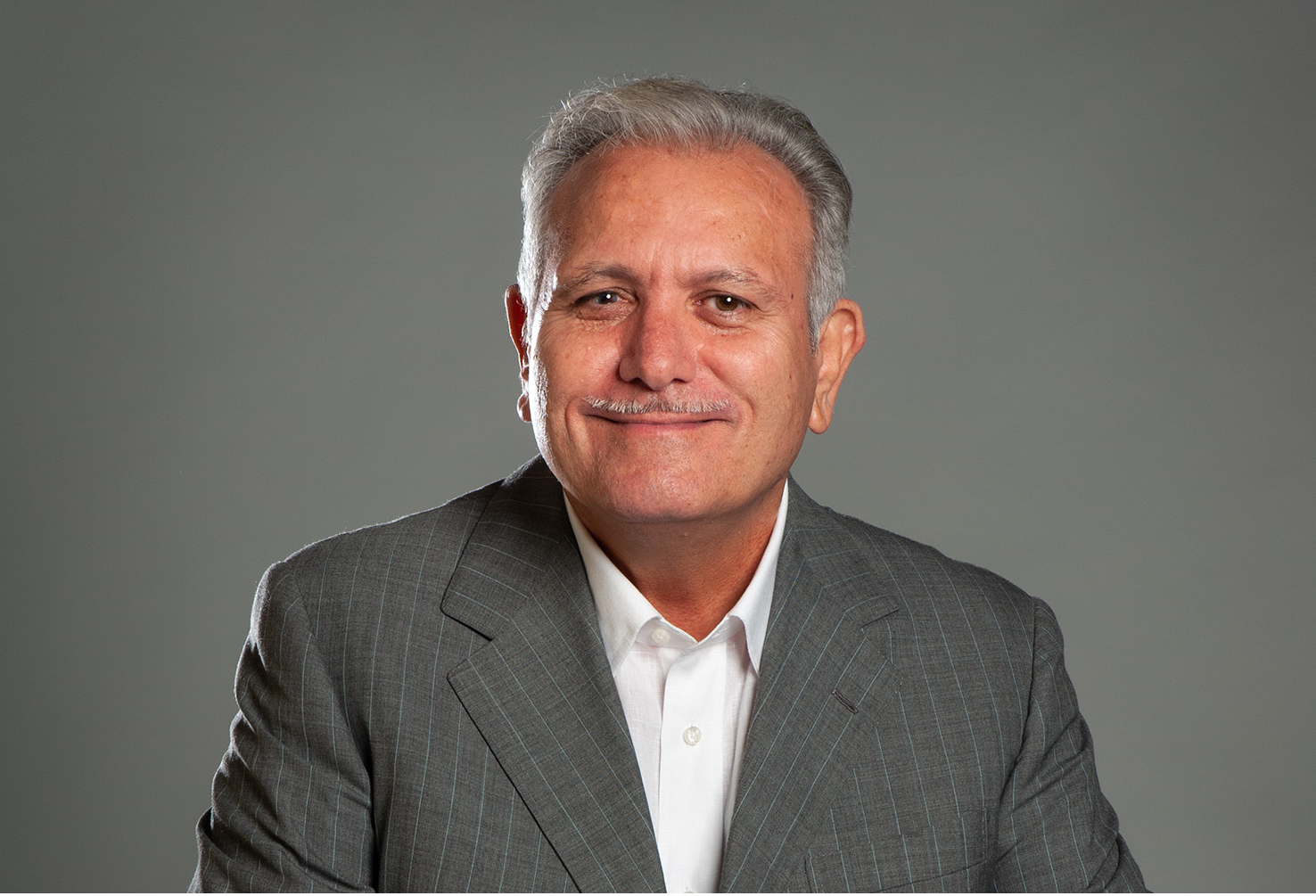
Chatgilialoglu in 2020

== Education and career ==
In 1971 Chatgilialoglu moved from Greece to Italy for university studies and began his scientific involvement at the University of Bologna, where he obtained his Italian doctorate degree (Laurea) from the Faculty of Industrial Chemistry. In 1977 he moved to England for a two-year postdoctoral appointment at the University of York with Professor R.O.C. Norman. In the end of 1979, he moved to Canada for a three-year postdoctoral appointment at the National Research Council of Canada, with Professor K.U. Ingold.

In 1983 he joined the National Research Council (CNR) of Italy in Bologna as Visiting Scientist becoming permanent Researcher in 1985. From 1991 he held the position of Research Director at the Institute of Organic Synthesis and Photoreactivity (ISOF) of CNR Research Area of Bologna until he retired from this position in the end of 2019, becoming Research Associate of ISOF-CNR from February 2020.

From March 2014 to May 2016, Chatgilialoglu was appointed as the Director of the Institute of Nanoscience and Nanotechnology at the NCSR “Demokritos” in Athens (Greece) and from May 2015 he served as the vice-president of the NCSR “Demokritos” for one year.

He is the co-founder and President of the company Lipinutragen Srl, which was incorporated in December 2005 as spin-off company officially recognized by the CNR. From February 2019, he has been distinguished as visiting professor at the Center for Advanced Technologies, Adam Mickiewicz University, Poznań.

Dr. Chatgilialoglu is actually the leader of his research group in Bologna at ISOF-CNR. His actual research activities are focused on Free Radical Chemistry with a multidisciplinary approach including structure-reactivity-mechanism studies leading to applications in synthetic methodologies, materials science, and in life sciences.

== Research and Innovation ==
His forty-years research activity focuses mainly on free-radical chemistry using an original multidisciplinary approach that, informed by structure-reactivity-mechanism studies, led to applications in synthetic and analytical methodologies, materials science, and in life sciences. He is known for free radical chemistry and molecular mechanisms of cellular stress and related biomarkers.

His work on free radical properties and synthetic strategies has led to the discovery and development of tris(trimethylsilyl)silane as radical-based reducing agent (Fluka prize “Reagent of the Year 1990”) a breakthrough solution to the health and environmental toxicity of chemical reagents. The start and progress of this reagent in free radical chemistry have been presented from time to time in several reviews and books.

The focus on biomimetic radical chemistry have led to the discovery of the process occurring in eukaryotes that bring to the endogenous formation of trans-lipids; He has pioneered the epigenetic role of membrane fatty acids with the innovative approach of fatty acid-based membrane lipidomics, the evaluation of free radical-induced endogenous transformation of trans fatty acids and lipid remodelling in disease conditions. He developed the applicability of this scientific discovery in lipidomics to the market of molecular diagnostics by the foundation of the spin-off company Lipinutragen.

He has contributed the expertise on bioinspired synthetic approaches in the area of nucleic acids has been applied to discoveries in one of the most important processes related to aging and disease: the damaging potential of hydroxyl radical (HO•) toward deoxyribonucleic acid (DNA). He has contributed to understand the DNA damage mechanism leading to purine lesions, and developed the “gold standard” protocol for the accurate quantification of the purine lesions in DNA samples, using LC-MS/MS analysis and isotopomeric internal standards.

== Selected awards and honors ==
- 1989 Director of NATO Advanced Study Institute on Sulfur-Centered Reactive Intermediates in Chemistry and Biology.
- 1990 Visiting Scientist at the University of Basel, Switzerland
- 1990 Fluka prize (Reagent of the Year 1990).
- 1994 Director of NATO Advanced Study Institute on Chemical Synthesis: Gnosis to Prognosis
- 1999 Visiting Scientist at the Russian Academy of Sciences, Ufa and Chernogolovka, Russia
- 1999 Wilsmore Fellow at the University of Melbourne, Australia
- 2000 Guest Professorship at Universitè Pierre et Marie Curie, Paris, France
- 2007 Chair of the COST Action CM0603: Free Radicals in Chemical Biology (06/2007–06/ 2011).
- 2008 Visiting professor at LMU Munich, Germany
- 2009 Guest Professorship at Universitè Pierre et Marie Curie, Paris, France
- 2012 Chair of the COST Action CM01201: Biomimetic Radical Chemistry (12/2012–12/2016).
- 2017 34th IOCF Yoshida Lectureship, Kyoto/Osaka, Japan.

== Publications ==
Chatgilialoglu is the author or co-author of more than 300 publications in peer-reviewed journals, more than 35 book chapters, several patents and 9 books. He is the Author of the monograph Organosilanes in Radical Chemistry, Wiley 2004; Co-editor of the Encyclopedia of Radical in Chemistry, Biology and Materials (4 volumes), Wiley 2012; Co-author of Membrane Lipidomics for Personalized Health, Wiley 2015.
