= Atomium – European Institute for Science, Media and Democracy =

Atomium European Institute for Science and Democracy (EISMD) is an international non-profit organisation based in Brussels. The Institute convenes European universities, global businesses and policymakers to develop innovative initiatives and frontier thinking based on scientific evidence to provide evidence-based analysis and advice in governmental and decision-making processes.

The organisation was launched publicly in 2009 at the European Parliament in Brussels by the former French President Valéry Giscard d'Estaing and Michelangelo Baracchi Bonvicini.

== History ==
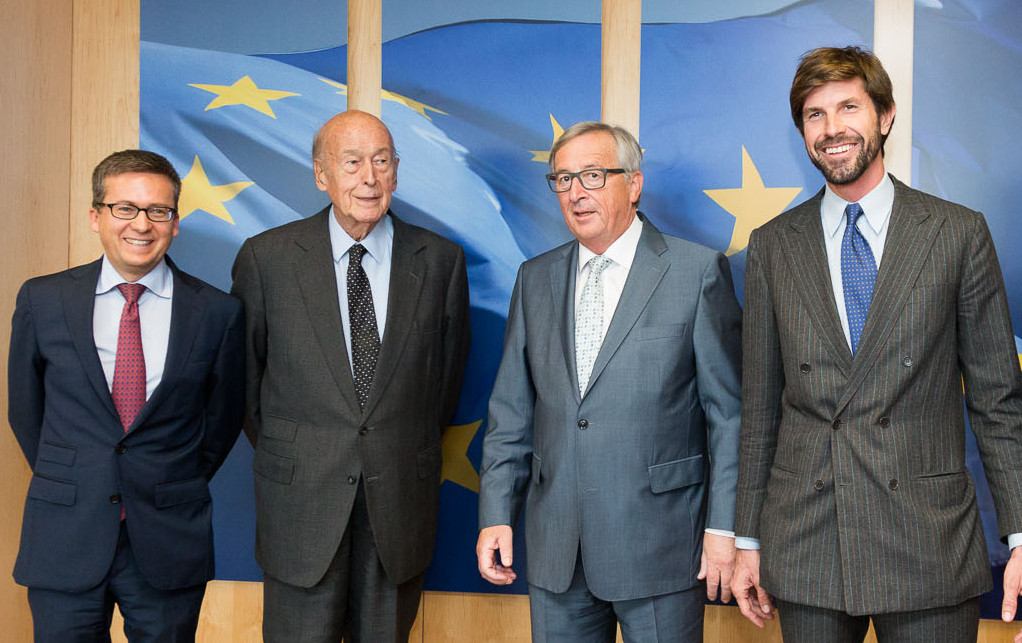
Carlos Moedas, Valéry Giscard d'Estaing, Jean-Claude Juncker, Michelangelo Baracchi Bonvicini at the European Commission

In 2006 Atomium - European Institute for Science, Media and Democracy was formally founded under the Law of Belgium as International Non-Profit Organisation (Association International Sans But Lucratif). During its start-up, the institute involved more than forty leading European universities and businesses as its members, building a large network of political leaders such as Valéry Giscard d'Estaing, Felipe González, Tony Blair, Esko Aho, Jerzy Buzek, Jean-Claude Juncker, Angela Merkel. The first Secretary General of Atomium-EISMD was Bruno Le Maire, French Minister of Economy (2017-2024).

In November 2009 Atomium - European Institute for Science, Media and Democracy was officially launched publicly at the European Parliament. On 9 November 2009 Giscard d'Estaing and Baracchi Bonvicini signed the European Manifesto of Atomium - European Institute for Science, Media and Democracy.

On May 18, 2010, Giscard d'Estaing and Baracchi Bonvicini presented the Report on European Research and Innovation 2020 together with the President of the European Parliament Jerzy Buzek and the European Commissioner for Research, Innovation and Science Máire Geoghegan-Quinn. The report presented the proposal shared by the members of the Institute to address the European Commission's research and innovation policy

In September 2012, during the negotiations regarding the EU budget for 2014–2020, Baracchi Bonvicini and Giscard d'Estaing together with the former prime minister of Spain Felipe González Márquez, jointly signed the appeal "For a European Consciousness, For a More Competitive Europe" asking EU member states to increase the budget for research and innovation. The appeal was sent to all European prime ministers and head of governments published by numerous European newspapers including Frankfurter Allgemeine Zeitung, El País, Il Sole 24 Ore and The Irish Times.

== REIsearch ==
REIsearch is a non-profit initiative co-funded by the European Commission Nokia, Elsevier, and other Atomium partners. The aim is to connect researchers and policy makers on topics linked to scientific research in order to promote evidence-based policy making. After the launch Jean-Claude Juncker declared: "Innovation and new scientific discoveries are improving people's lives and making our economy more competitive. Science should be open and freed from its traditional ivory tower; to be discussed, submitted to critique and fed with new perspectives. That's why I warmly welcome efforts such as the REIsearch initiative to inspire fresh ideas about how to solve some of our society's most pressing problems".

In the first three years of activity REIsearch has focused on specific subject areas such as Chronic Diseases, in collaboration with European Commission's DG Sante, Next Generation Internet and Digital Skills, in collaboration with DG Connect, reaching hundreds of thousands of European citizens with its media campaigns and surveys.

== AI4People ==
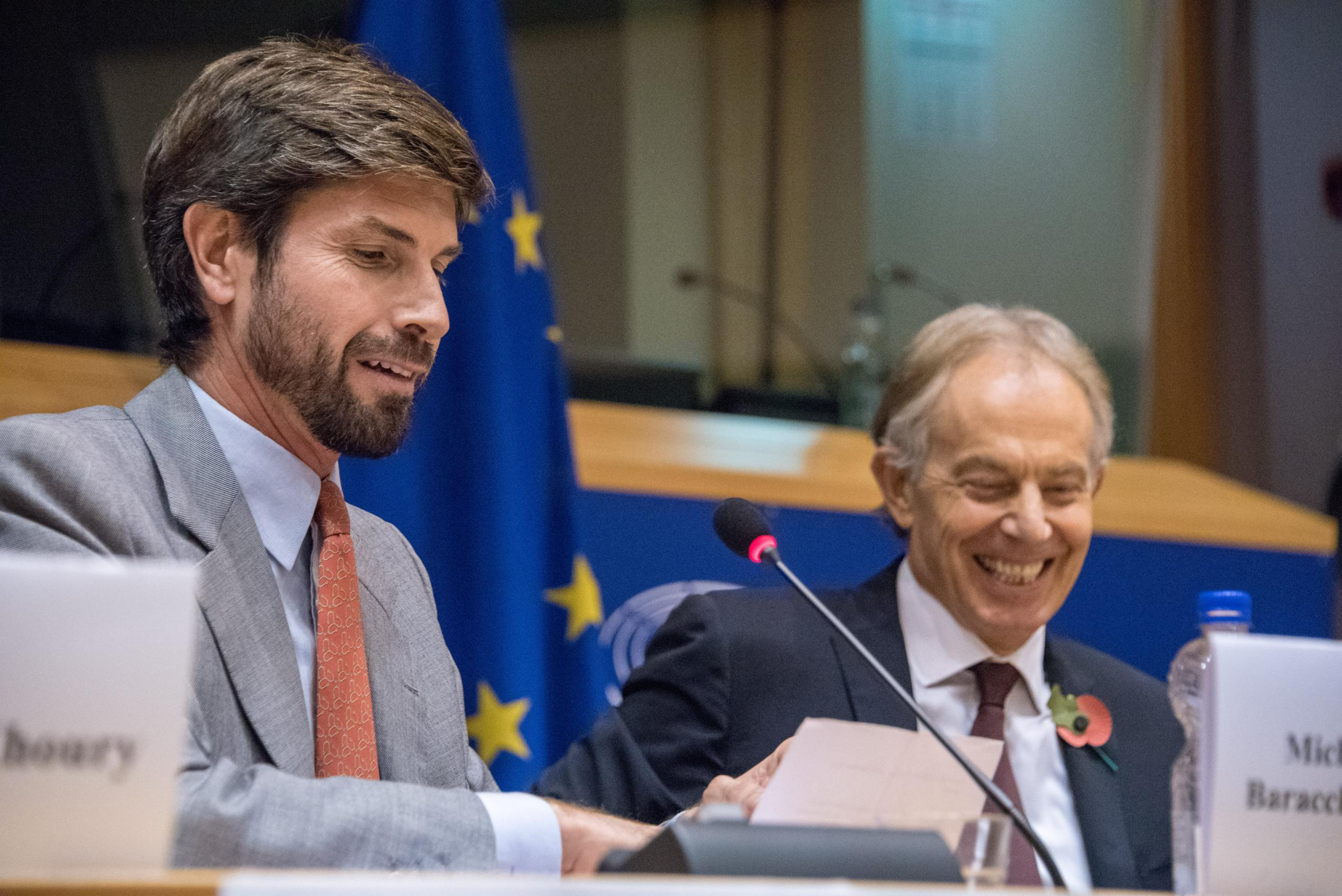
Tony Blair and Michelangelo Baracchi Bonvicini at the European Parliament for the presentation of the "AI4 People's Ethical Framework for a good AI Society"

In 2018 the Institute have launched AI4People the first multi-stakeholder forum in Europe to shape the debate on AI Ethics in the European Union and prompt European institutions to act quickly to stem future AI risks. Audi, Elsevier, Meta, Fujitsu, Google, Intesa SanPaolo, Johnson & Johnson and Microsoft were founding members.

As result of the first year of activity AI4People presented at the European Parliament the "AI4People's Ethical Framework for a Good AI Society: Opportunities, Risks, Principles, and Recommendations" during the "Towards a Good AI Society Summit" opened By Tony Blair.The report is at the origins of the regulatory process that led to the Al Act in the European Union, the world's first Al regulation.
