= Semantic processing =

Mental process of relating a perceived word to other words of similar meaning

In psycholinguistics, semantic processing is the stage of language processing that occurs after one hears a word and encodes its meaning: the mind relates the word to other words with similar meanings. Once a word is perceived, it is placed in a context mentally that allows for a deeper processing. Therefore, semantic processing produces memory traces that last longer than those produced by shallow processing, since shallow processing produces fragile memory traces that decay rapidly.

Proper semantic cognition requires 1) knowledge about the item/word and its features or associations, 2) retrieving the proper information that fits one's current goals and situation. For example, if one saw a sign while driving that said “fork in the road ahead” they should be able to inhibit a strong association (e.g., silverware), and retrieve a distant association that is more relevant meaning (e.g., road structures).

Semantic processing is the deepest level of processing and it requires the listener to think about the meaning of the cue. Studies on brain imaging have shown that, when semantic processing occurs, there is increased brain activity in the left prefrontal regions of the brain that does not occur during different kinds of processing. One study used MRI to measure the brain activity of subjects while they made semantic decisions. The participants then took a memory test after a short period of time. When the subjects showed high confidence and correctly retained the information, the fMRI measured increased activity in the left prefrontal regions.

== Convergent semantic processing ==
Convergent semantic processing occurs during tasks that elicit a limited number of responses. During these tasks, subjects must suppress alternate options in order to select a single best option from a multitude of choices. It is believed that the left hemisphere of the brain dominates convergent semantic processing due to the fine grained, small window of temporal integration. Spatially, neurons in the left hemispheres occupy mutually exclusive regions, allowing for the more fine-tuned response seen in convergent semantic processing.

=== Neurons in the left hemisphere ===
During semantic processing, the left hemisphere will prime for the dominant and the subordinate meaning of an ambiguous word (words are considered to be ambiguous when their semantic features separate into distinct semantic representations). The left hemisphere will then select the dominant or most relevant meaning of the word, and inhibit meanings that are less relevant or frequent. Despite activating subordinate meanings of the words, the left hemisphere shows no facilitation of them, and their activation decays very quickly. Compared to the right hemisphere, the left hemisphere activates a small semantic field and close semantic relationships strongly. While convergent semantic processing and the activation of common word meanings and semantic features are advantageous for various linguistic tasks, the left hemisphere faces challenges in scenarios where the recognition of an ambiguous word requires the activation of multiple primes that can either converge into a subordinate meaning or diverge into incompatible meanings of the word.

Studies of patients with left hemisphere damage have demonstrated a disruption of convergent semantic processing, causing subjects to associate words with abstract, non-literal meanings produced by the right hemisphere. For example, a subject with left hemisphere damage may affiliate the word “deep” with “wise” rather than its literal antonym “shallow.” However, damage to the Left Hemisphere will preserve summation priming.

Semantic processing can also be affected by various health conditions such as semantic aphasia, which may be a result of a unilateral stroke to the left inferior frontal gyrus and posterior middle temporal gyrus. Individuals with semantic aphasia may struggle with controlled semantic retrieval. They may also show deficits in semantic tasks that have different retrieval demands.

=== Examples of convergent processing ===
To test for convergent processing, an experimenter may instructs the subject to select an infinite verb that most accurately describes the function of each stimuli. For example, if the experimenter were to present the word “hammer,” the participant would have to suppress related meanings such as “to crush” or “to assemble,” and instead select the most familiar meaning, like “to pound.” Other examples of potential stimuli are below and the proper selection of their corresponding infinite verbs are below.

Stimulus/Verb

- Hammer --> To Pound
- Needle --> To Sew,
- Bat --> To Swing
- Sponge --> To Scrub
- Basketball --> To Shoot
- Pencil --> To Write

== Divergent semantic processing ==
Divergent semantic processing occurs during linguistic tasks that can elicit a large variety of responses. During these tasks, listeners produce different possible meanings and list all the other words that come to their minds. It is believed that the right hemisphere of the brain commands divergent semantic processing through its coarse grained, large windows of temporal integration. Neurons in the right hemisphere occupy overlapping regions of space, allowing for the network activation of concepts necessary for divergent processing.

=== Neurons in the right hemisphere ===
The right hemisphere activates concepts that are more loosely associated with a stimulus, allowing for production of non-literal and less frequent meanings of words. Activation of words in the Right Hemisphere is less discriminant compared to the Left Hemisphere. It will activate closely related words to the same extend as the loosely related words. Though the Right Hemisphere is slower in activating the dominant and subordinate meanings of ambiguous words, the activation of both dominant and subordinate meanings are sustained for longer periods of time compared to the Left Hemisphere's activation during convergent semantic processing.

Studies of patient with right hemisphere damage have demonstrated a disruption of divergent semantic processing, causing subjects to affiliate words with concrete, literal meanings produced by the left hemisphere. They are able to understand the primary meanings of individual words, and also don't have impairments at the phonemic level. For example, a subject with right hemisphere damage will group the word “deep” with its antonym “shallow,” and have trouble producing the non-literal association of “deep” with “wise.” Furthermore, their significant loss of divergent processing can affect things like their ability to understand jokes, metaphors, idioms, etc., as proper understanding may be heavily reliant on sustained activation of the different meanings of a word. Other right hemisphere deficits include naming categories but not functions, naming pictures of collective nouns, and naming goal-oriented categories.

=== Examples of divergent processing ===
To test for divergent processing, the experimenter would instruct the subject to produce as many verbs as possible for a stimulus. For example, if the stimulus was basketball, the subject would list to shoot, to pass, etc. Further examples are below

Stimulus/Verbs

- Basketball: To shoot, to pass, to throw, to dribble, to steal, to block, to tip, to spin, etc.
- Pencil: To write, to draw, to erase, to break, to sharpen, to scribble, to flick, etc.
- Phone: to call, to text, to scroll, to play, to communicate, to connect, etc.

== Example of hemispheric differences in associations ==
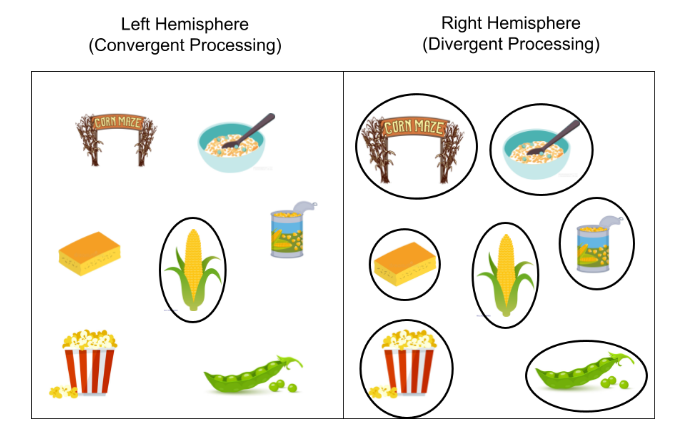
Visual Depiction of Left and Right Hemispheres during Semantic Processing

Above is an example of what differences in the Left and Right Hemispheres may look like during semantic processing. If one was told asked for the associations of the word "corn," the Left Hemisphere would most likely quickly prime the image circled above, a corn on the cob. The Right Hemisphere on the other hand, would prime both the corn on the cob, as well as other loosely associated words or meanings, like a corn maze, cornbread, popcorn, or even other starchy vegetables like peas. Though it works slower, the Right Hemisphere is able to activate a wider semantic network, and sustain it for longer than the Left Hemisphere.
