= Pescara =

Pescara Piscàrë (Neapolitan)
- Comune
- Città di Pescara
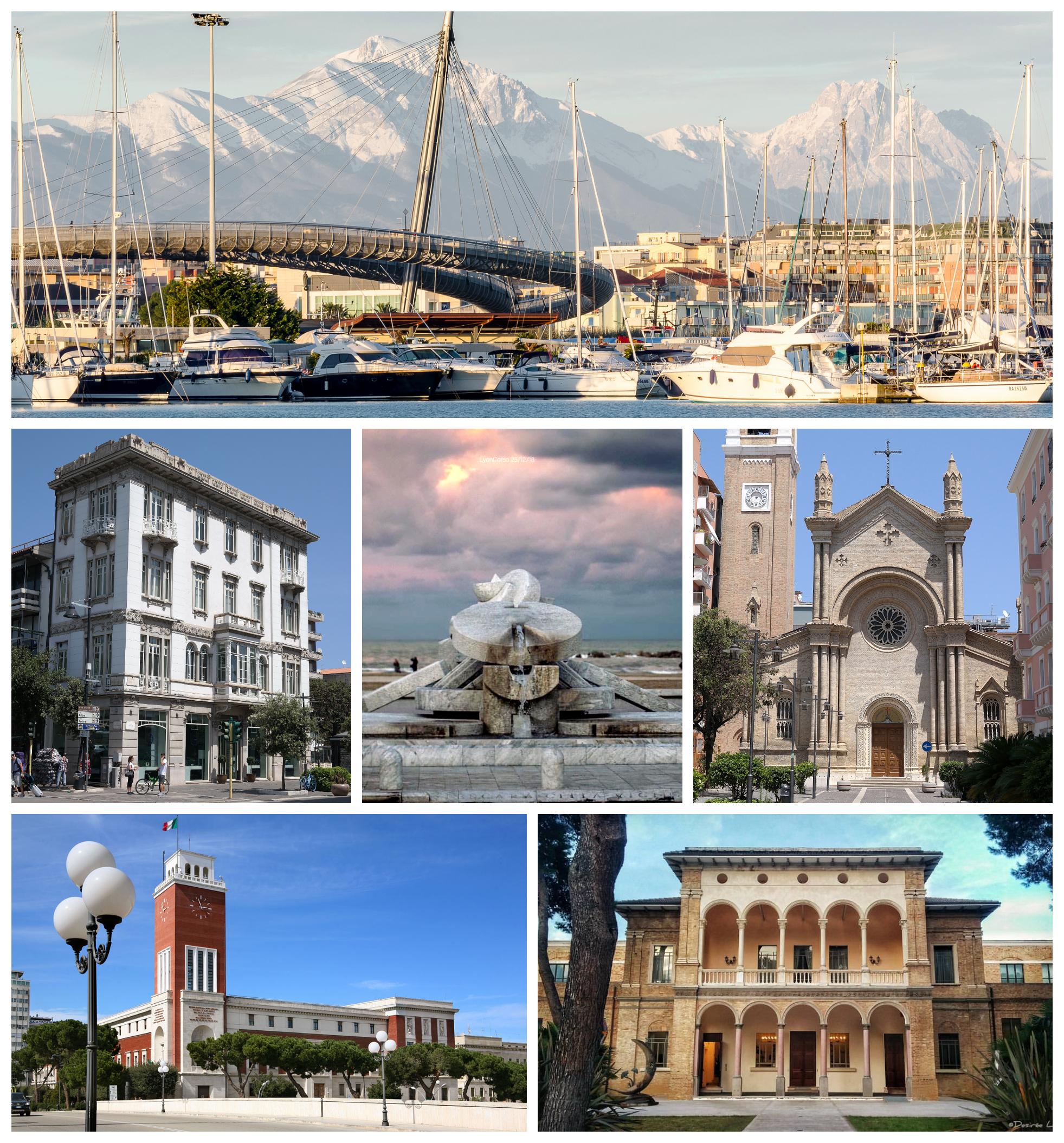
- Top: port of Pescara and Gran Sasso d'Italia; Centre: Palazzo Imperato; Fountain La Nave; and Church of the Sacred Heart; Bottom: Palazzo di Città; and Aurum Museum

- Flag Coat of arms
- Motto(s): HÆC EST CIVITAS ATERNI PORTA APRUTII ET SERA REGNI (Latin) "This is the city of Aternum, gate of Abruzzi and border of the Kingdom"
- Location within Italy Location within Abruzzo
- Coordinates: 42°27′50″N 14°12′51″E
- Country: Italy
- Region: Abruzzo
- Province: Pescara (PE)
- Founded: 1811
- Frazioni: San Silvestro

Government
  - Mayor: Carlo Masci (FI)

Area
  - Total: 34.36 km^{2} (13.27 sq mi)
- Highest elevation: 180 m (590 ft)
- Lowest elevation: 0 m (0 ft)

Population (2026)
  - Total: 118,487
  - Density: 3,448/km^{2} (8,931/sq mi)
- Demonym: Pescaresi
- Time zone: UTC+1 (CET)
  - Summer (DST): UTC+2 (CEST)
- Postal code: 65100
- Dialing code: 085
- ISTAT code: 068028
- Patron saint: Saint Cetteus
- Saint day: 10 October
- Website: Official website

Pescara (Italian: [pesˈkaːra]; Abruzzese: Pescàrë; Pescarese: Piscàrë) is the capital city of the province of Pescara, in the region of Abruzzo in southern Italy. With a population of 118,487, and about 294,800 including the surrounding urban area, it is also the largest city in Abruzzo. Located on the Adriatic coast at the mouth of the River Aterno-Pescara, the present-day municipality was formed in 1927 joining the municipalities of the old Pescara fortress, the part of the city to the south of the river, and Castellamare Adriatico, the part of the city to the north of the river. The surrounding area was formed into the province of Pescara.

The main commercial street of the city is Corso Umberto I, which runs between two squares, starting from Piazza della Repubblica and reaching the seacoast in Piazza Primo Maggio. The rectangle that it forms with Corso Vittorio Emanuele II and Via Nicola Fabrizi is home of the main shopping district, enclosed in a driving restriction zone, where several of the best fashion shops are located. Corso Manthoné, the course of the old Pescara, has, for many years, been the center of the nightlife of the city. City hall and the administration of the province are in Piazza Italia, near the river, and in the area between here and the D'Annunzio University campus to the south, a business district has grown up over the years, while the Marina is situated to the immediate south of the mouth of the river. Pescara is also served by an international airport, the Abruzzo Airport, and one of the major touristic ports of the Adriatic Sea and Italy, the Port of Pescara.

== History ==
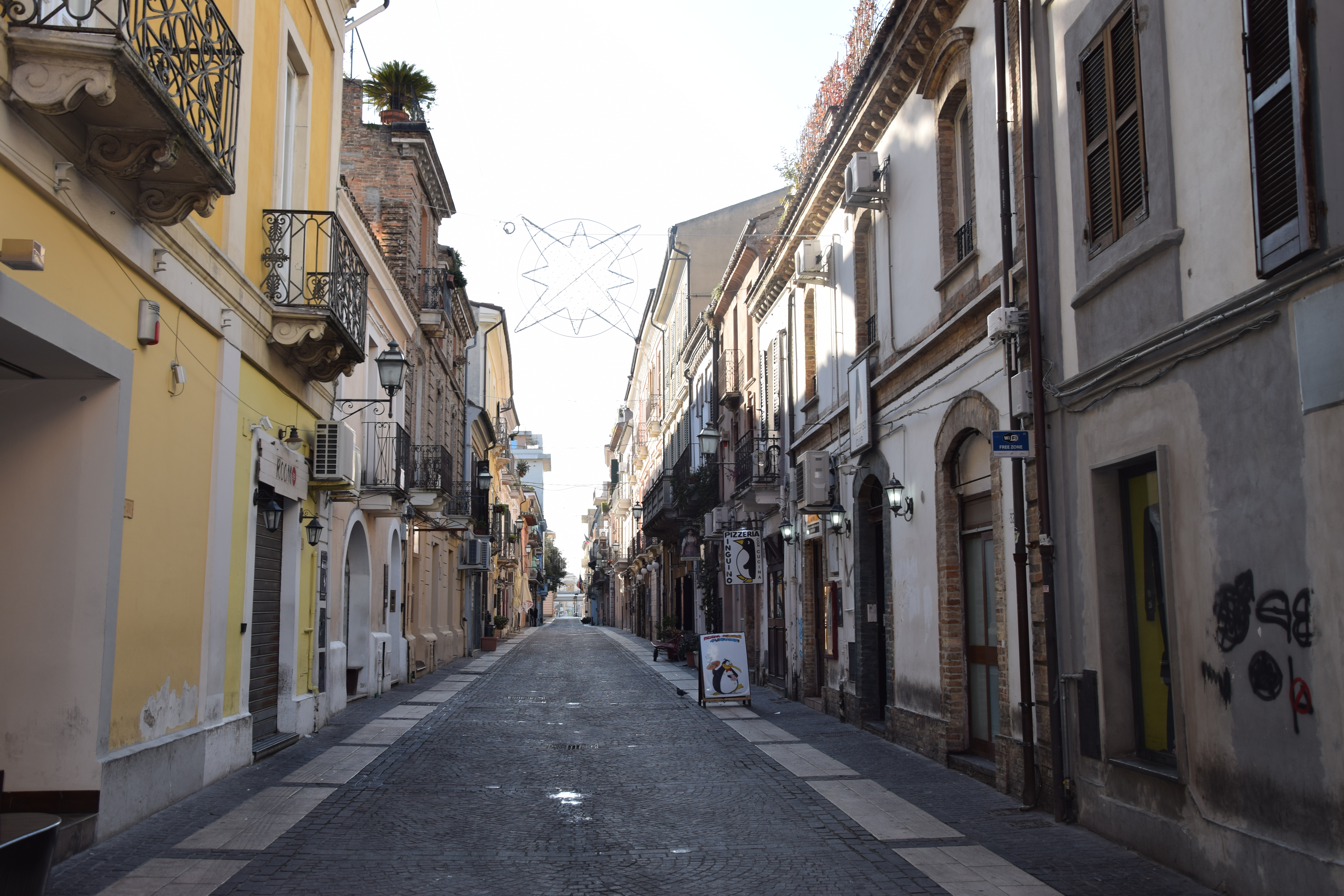
Old town

Pescara's origins precede the Roman conquest. It was founded to be the port of Vestini and Marrucini tribes to trade with the peoples of the Orient, a supporting role that was held for centuries. The name of both the town and the river was Aternum, it was connected to Rome through the Via Claudia Valeria and the Via Tiburtina. The main building was the temple of Jovis Aternium. The town was an important port for trade with the Eastern provinces of the Empire.

In the Middle Ages it was destroyed by the Lombards (597). Saint Cetteus, the town's patron saint, was a bishop of the 6th century, elected to the see of Amiternum in Sabina (today the city of San Vittorino) in 590, during the pontificate of Gregory the Great. His legend goes that he was executed by the Lombards at Amiternum by being thrown off a bridge with a stone tied around his neck; his body floated to Pescara.

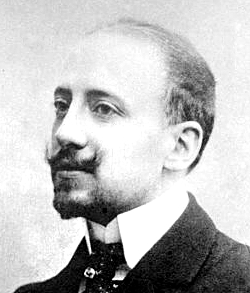
The poet Gabriele D'Annunzio

In 1095 Pescara was a fishing village enriched with monuments and churches. In 1140 Roger of Sicily conquered the town, giving rise to a period in which it was destroyed by armies ravaging the Kingdom of Sicily. The name of Piscaria ("abounding with fish") is mentioned for the first time in this period. Several seignors ruled over Pescara afterwards, including Rainaldo Orsini, Louis of Savoy, and Francesco del Borgo, the vicar of king Ladislaus of Naples, who had the fortress and the tower built. The subsequent rulers were the D'Ávalos. In 1424 the famous condottiero Muzio Attendolo died here. Another adventurer, Jacopo Caldora, conquered the town in 1435 and 1439. In the following years Pescara was repeatedly attacked by the Venetians, and later, as part of the Spanish Kingdom of Naples, it was turned into a massive fortress.

In 1566 it was besieged by 105 Turk galleys. It resisted fiercely and the Ottomans only managed to ravage the surrounding territory.

At the beginning of the 18th century Pescara had some 3,000 inhabitants, half of them living in Castellammare, a small frazione of the fortress. In 1707 it was attacked by Austrian troops under the command of the Count of Wallis: the town, led by Giovanni Girolamo II Acquaviva, resisted for two months before capitulating.

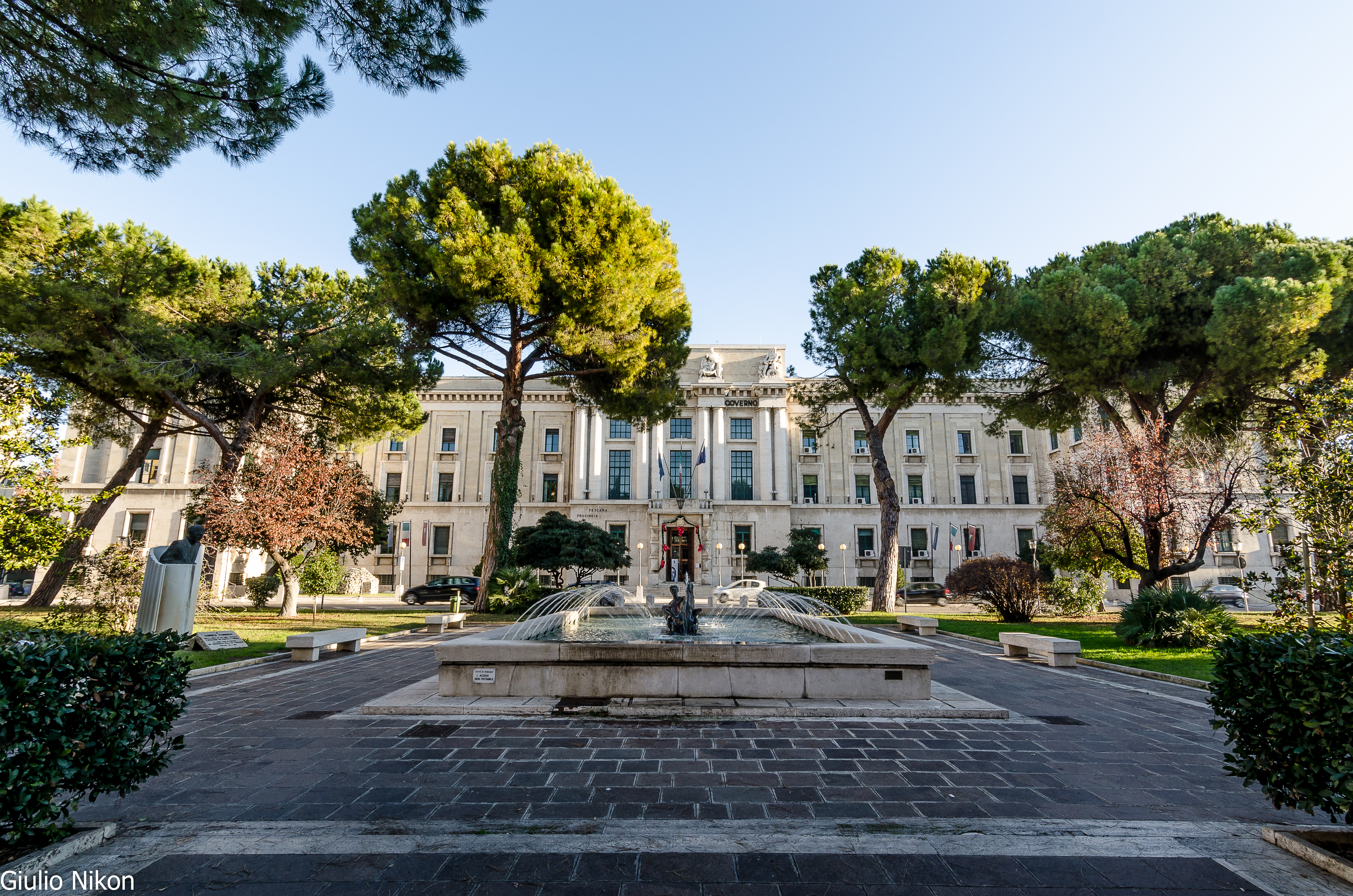
Government building, seat of the Province of Pescara

Pescara was always part of the Kingdom of Naples, apart from the brief age of the Republic of Naples of 1798–99. The town was therefore attacked by the pro-Bourbon Giuseppe Pronio. In 1800 Pescara fell to French troops, becoming an important military stronghold of Joseph Bonaparte's reign. Castellammare, which now had 3,000 inhabitants of its own, became a separate municipality.

In 1814, Pescara's Carboneria revolted against Joachim Murat. There, on 15 May 1815, the king undersigned one of the first constitutions of the Italian Risorgimento. In the following years Pescara became a symbol of the Bourbon's violent restoration as it housed one of the most notorious Bourbon jails. After a devastating flood in 1853, Pescara was liberated by Giuseppe Garibaldi's collaborator Clemente De Caesaris in 1860. Seven years later the fortress was dismantled.

In the sixty following years Pescara was included in the Province of Chieti and then merged with the adjacent town of Castellammare Adriatico and eventually became the largest city of its region. The new city suffered heavy civilian casualties when it was bombed by the Allies who were attempting to cut German supply lines during World War II. It has since been massively rebuilt, becoming a very modern coastal city of Italy.

== Geography ==
Pescara is situated at sea level on the Adriatic coast and has developed from some centuries BC onwards at the strategic position around the mouth of the Aterno-Pescara River. The coast is low and sandy and the beach extends, unbroken for some distance to both the north and the south of the river, reaching a width of approximately 140 metres (150 yd) in the area around a pineta (a small pine forest) to the north. To the south the pine forest that once gave shade to bathers along much of the Adriatic coast, has almost disappeared near the beach, but remains within the Nature Reserve Pineta Dannunziana.

The urban fabric of the city spreads over a flat T-shaped area, which occupies the valley around the river and the coastal strip. To the northwest and the southwest, the city is also expanding into the surrounding hills which were first occupied in the Neolithic period.

The whole city is affected by the presence of groundwater, the level of which varies by up to a metre, being at its highest in spring due to snow melting in the mountains inland.

The city is very close to the mountains, and the ski slopes of Passo Lanciano are a 30 minute drive away.

The city is set to expand on 1 January 2027, when neighboring towns of Montesilvano and Spoltore will be annexed into the city. The residents of the three towns voted in a referendum on the merger on 25 May 2014. 70.32% of Pescara voters approved the annexation, also 52.23% of Montesilvano and 51.15% of Spoltore voters. The regional law approving the merger was passed by the regional council on 8 August 2018, with the merger to become law on 1 January 2022. It was later delayed into 2023 and again into 2027.

=== Climate ===
Pescara has a humid subtropical climate (Cfa) with Mediterranean influences. The city's climate is characterized by hot summers and cool winters. Since its driest month has 34 mm (1.3 inches) of precipitation, the city cannot be solely classified as Mediterranean. Not to mention, although there is a dry tendency in early summer, August (late summer) is as wet as the winter month of February, which is unusual for the Mediterranean pattern.

The average temperature is around 7 °C (45 °F) in the coldest month (January) and 24.5 °C (76.1 °F) in the warmest month (July). The lowest temperature recorded in the city was −13 °C (9 °F) on 4 January 1979. The highest was registered on 30 August 2007 at 45 °C (113 °F). Precipitation is low (around 676 mm (26.6 in) per annum) and concentrated mainly in the late autumn.

Pescara is a coastal city, but its climate is influenced by the surrounding mountains (the Maiella and the chain of Gran Sasso). When the wind is southwesterly, Pescara experiences a Foehn wind that often reaches 100 km/h (62 mph), causing a sudden increase in temperature and decrease in relative humidity, and for that reason winters with temperatures that exceed 20 °C (68 °F) almost daily are not unknown. Pescara experiences 35 days annually with minimum temperature below 0 °C (32 °F).

Under northeasterly winds Pescara suffers precipitation which is generally weak, but can be much more intense if accompanied by a depression. Also from the north east comes winter weather from Siberia that, on average, brings abundant snowfalls every 3–4 years. In summer the weather is mostly stable and sunny with temperatures that, thanks to the sea breeze, rarely exceed 35 degrees unless a southwesterly Libeccio is blowing. Particularly in summer, but also in winter, the high humidity leads to morning and evening mist or haze.

Climate data for Pescara (1951–2000)
Month	Jan	Feb	Mar	Apr	May	Jun	Jul	Aug	Sep	Oct	Nov	Dec	Year
Record high °C (°F)	23.3 (73.9)	24.4 (75.9)	26.6 (79.9)	30.6 (87.1)	34.9 (94.8)	35.4 (95.7)	38.4 (101.1)	40.5 (104.9)	35.5 (95.9)	31.2 (88.2)	27.6 (81.7)	26.0 (78.8)	40.5 (104.9)
Mean daily maximum °C (°F)	10.4 (50.7)	11.4 (52.5)	13.5 (56.3)	16.9 (62.4)	21.3 (70.3)	25.3 (77.5)	28.4 (83.1)	28.3 (82.9)	25.0 (77.0)	20.4 (68.7)	15.5 (59.9)	11.9 (53.4)	19.0 (66.2)
Daily mean °C (°F)	7.0 (44.6)	7.7 (45.9)	9.7 (49.5)	12.7 (54.9)	16.9 (62.4)	20.8 (69.4)	23.5 (74.3)	23.4 (74.1)	20.4 (68.7)	16.2 (61.2)	11.8 (53.2)	8.4 (47.1)	14.9 (58.8)
Mean daily minimum °C (°F)	3.6 (38.5)	3.9 (39.0)	5.8 (42.4)	8.5 (47.3)	12.5 (54.5)	16.3 (61.3)	18.6 (65.5)	18.5 (65.3)	15.8 (60.4)	12.1 (53.8)	8.2 (46.8)	4.8 (40.6)	10.7 (51.3)
Record low °C (°F)	−10.5 (13.1)	−6.8 (19.8)	−5.3 (22.5)	−0.4 (31.3)	1.7 (35.1)	7.3 (45.1)	11.0 (51.8)	10.5 (50.9)	6.3 (43.3)	3.0 (37.4)	−1.7 (28.9)	−5.2 (22.6)	−10.5 (13.1)
Average precipitation mm (inches)	60.8 (2.39)	51.4 (2.02)	59.0 (2.32)	53.8 (2.12)	37.5 (1.48)	42.5 (1.67)	35.0 (1.38)	43.5 (1.71)	62.6 (2.46)	76.8 (3.02)	78.4 (3.09)	83.5 (3.29)	684.8 (26.95)
Average precipitation days (≥ 1.0 mm)	6.4	6.3	6.6	5.9	4.7	4.6	3.7	3.8	5.1	7.0	7.5	7.7	69.3
Source: Regione Abruzzo

Climate data for Pescara (Abruzzo Airport), 1981–2010 normals
Month	Jan	Feb	Mar	Apr	May	Jun	Jul	Aug	Sep	Oct	Nov	Dec	Year
Mean daily maximum °C (°F)	11.4 (52.5)	11.8 (53.2)	14.7 (58.5)	18.1 (64.6)	23.1 (73.6)	27.0 (80.6)	29.7 (85.5)	29.5 (85.1)	25.9 (78.6)	21.3 (70.3)	16.1 (61.0)	12.7 (54.9)	20.1 (68.2)
Daily mean °C (°F)	6.5 (43.7)	6.8 (44.2)	9.2 (48.6)	12.6 (54.7)	17.2 (63.0)	21.0 (69.8)	23.6 (74.5)	23.7 (74.7)	20.1 (68.2)	16.0 (60.8)	11.1 (52.0)	7.9 (46.2)	14.6 (58.4)
Mean daily minimum °C (°F)	1.5 (34.7)	1.7 (35.1)	3.8 (38.8)	7.1 (44.8)	11.3 (52.3)	15.0 (59.0)	17.4 (63.3)	18.0 (64.4)	14.3 (57.7)	10.8 (51.4)	6.1 (43.0)	3.2 (37.8)	9.2 (48.5)
Average precipitation mm (inches)	49.6 (1.95)	46.2 (1.82)	54.6 (2.15)	46.0 (1.81)	30.6 (1.20)	47.2 (1.86)	31.1 (1.22)	41.6 (1.64)	63.0 (2.48)	69.0 (2.72)	85.0 (3.35)	75.3 (2.96)	639.2 (25.16)
Average precipitation days	5.3	5.5	5.8	5.4	4.5	5	3.1	3.9	5.1	6.2	7.5	7.5	64.8
Average relative humidity (%)	74	73	72	71	72	70	69	71	72	75	76	76	73
Average dew point °C (°F)	0.7 (33.3)	0.5 (32.9)	2.8 (37.0)	6.2 (43.2)	10.6 (51.1)	14.2 (57.6)	15.9 (60.6)	16.6 (61.9)	13.4 (56.1)	10.2 (50.4)	5.9 (42.6)	2.4 (36.3)	8.3 (46.9)
Mean monthly sunshine hours	96.1	109.2	151.9	192.0	241.8	261.0	303.8	275.9	219.0	170.5	111.0	89.9	2,222.1
Mean daily sunshine hours	3.1	3.9	4.9	6.4	7.8	8.7	9.8	8.9	7.3	5.5	3.7	2.9	6.1
Source: NOAA (humidity and sun 1961–1990)

== Demographics ==
Historical population
Year	Pop.	±%
1861	9,449	—
1871	11,566	+22.4%
1881	12,561	+8.6%
1901	16,165	+28.7%
1911	21,564	+33.4%
1921	26,073	+20.9%
1931	37,966	+45.6%
1936	45,445	+19.7%
1951	65,466	+44.1%
1961	87,436	+33.6%
1971	122,470	+40.1%
1981	131,330	+7.2%
1991	122,236	−6.9%
2001	116,286	−4.9%
2011	117,166	+0.8%
2021	118,992	+1.6%
Source: ISTAT

As of 2026, the population is 118,487, of which 47.5% are males, and 52.5% are females. Minors make up 13.9% of the population, and seniors make up 27.3%.

=== Immigration ===
As of 2025, immigrants make up 9.6% of the population. The five largest foreign countries of birth are Romania, Ukraine, Venezuela, Albania, and Bangladesh.

== Sights ==
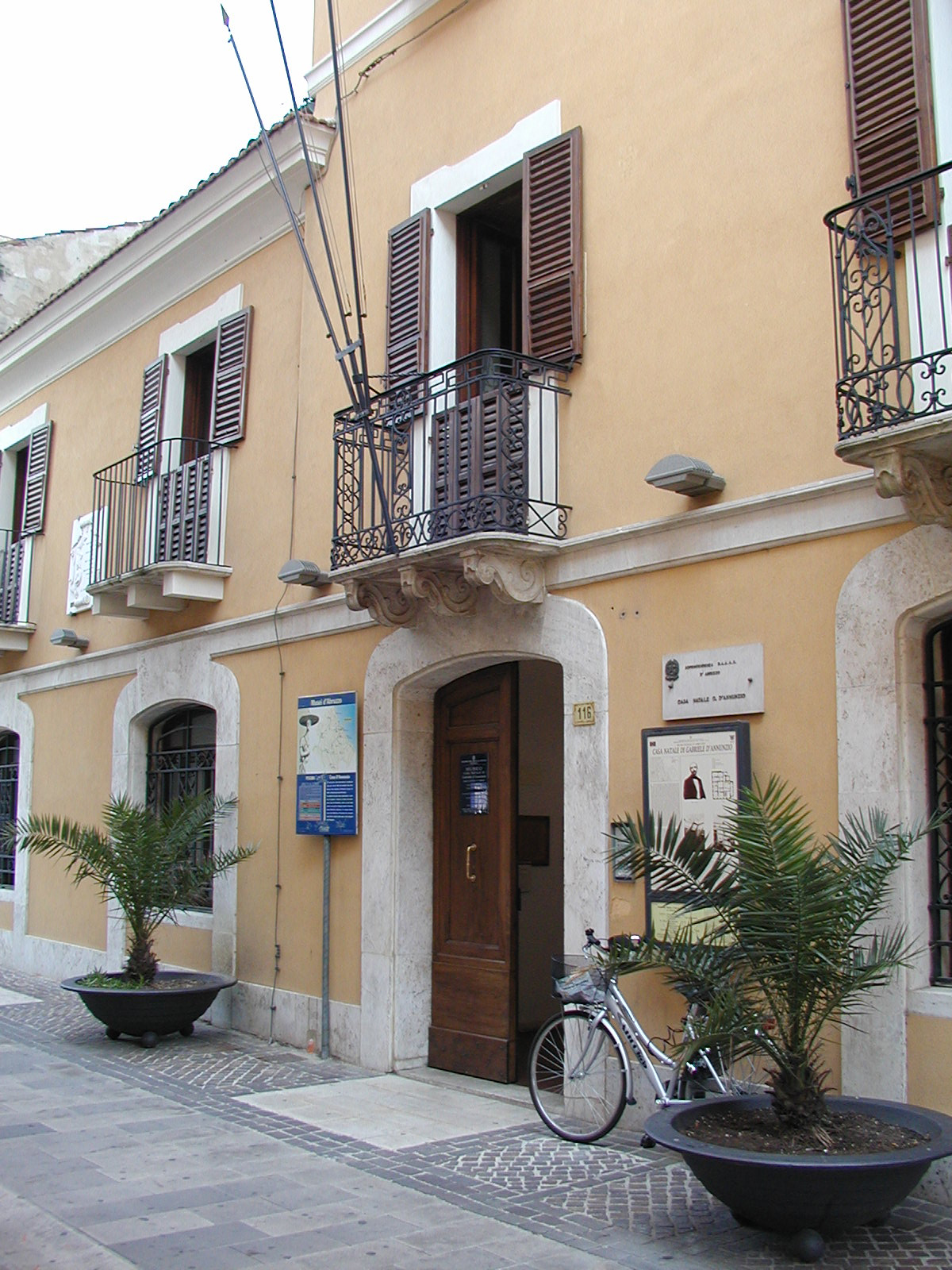
Gabriele D'Annunzio's birthplace house

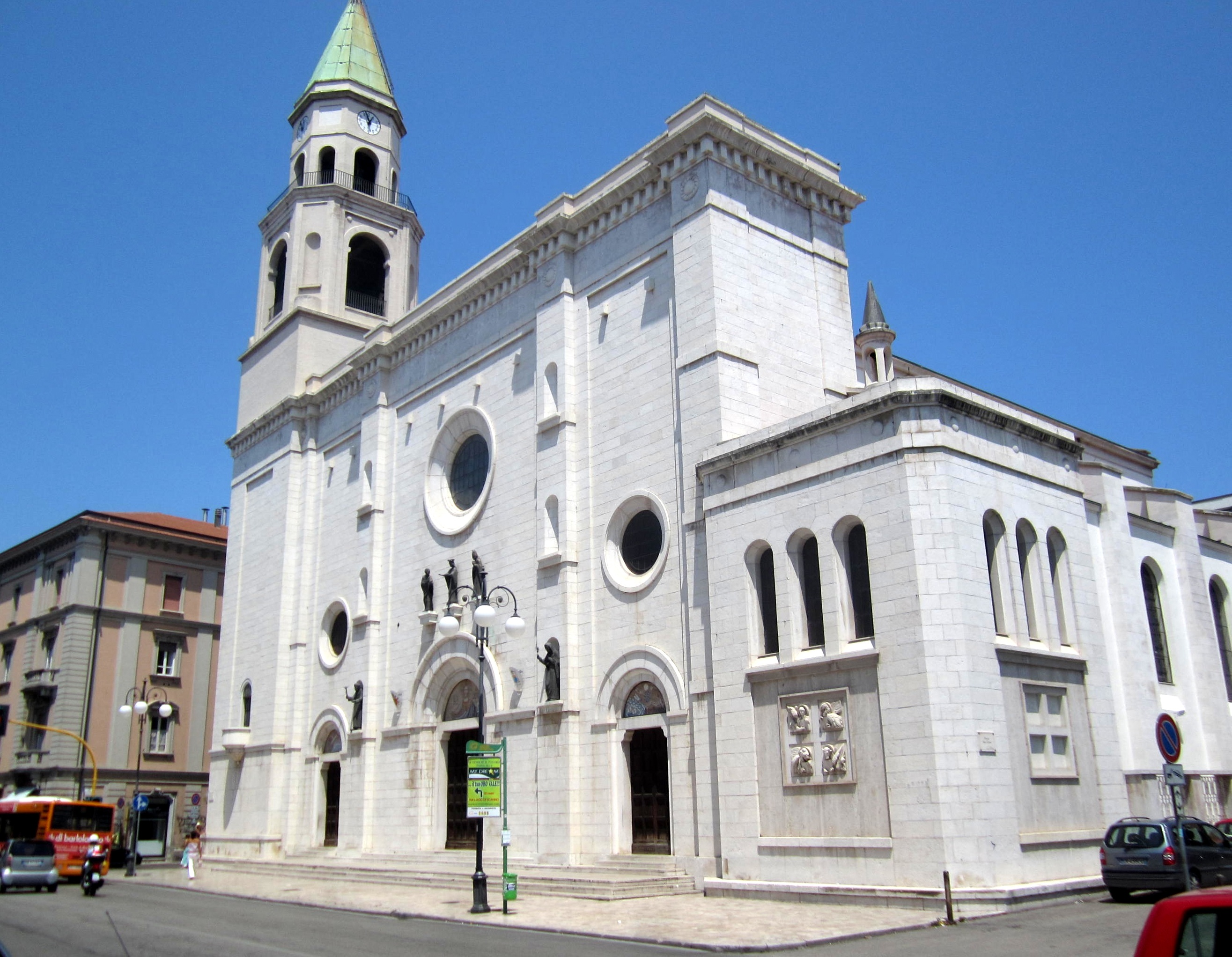
Pescara Cathedral

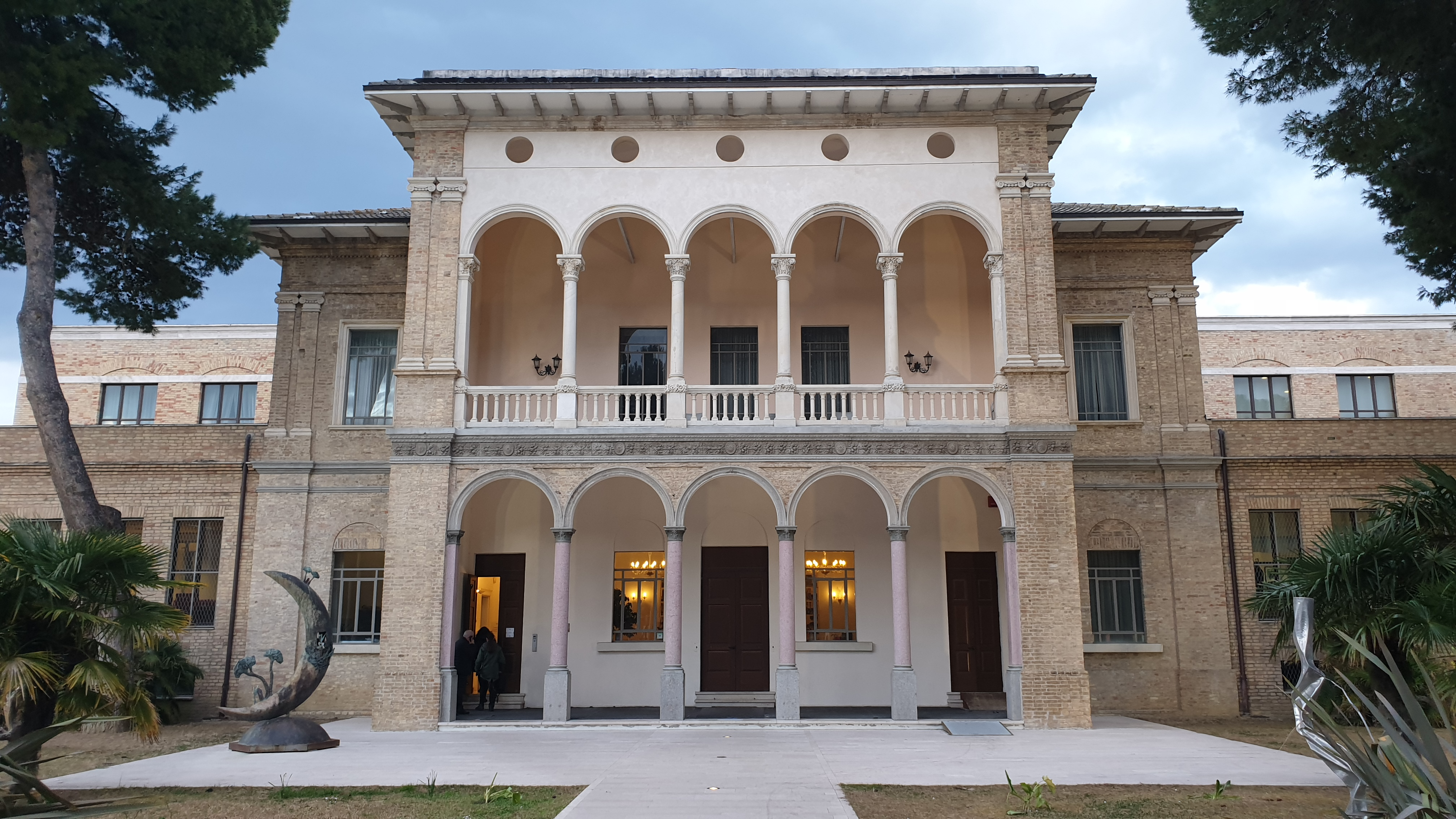
Aurum, built in 1910 in Art Nouveau style

The city is divided in two by the river in between.

The historic city center is located on the south shore, where once stood the Piazzaforte (fortified town), a military bulwark of the Kingdom of the Two Sicilies. There is the Bagno Borbonico (the old prison of the Kingdom of the Two Sicilies, built starting in 1510 by order of Charles V, which incorporated inside the remains of the Norman and Byzantine city walls). Today it houses the Museum of the Abruzzi people: the institution traces, through 13 halls dedicated to aspects of life, traditions and economy, 4,000 years of history of the Abruzzo people.

In the historic city center are the birthplace houses of Gabriele D'Annunzio and Ennio Flaiano, and the San Cetteo Cathedral, built between 1933 and 1938.

On the north shore of the river there's Piazza Italia (Italy Square), overlooked by the City Hall and the Government Building (which houses the headquarters of the Province of Pescara), both built during the Fascist era according to the fascist rationalist style and designed by the architect Vincenzo Pilotti. Pilotti designed the majority of the public buildings of the city, including the seat of the local Chamber of Commerce, of the Liceo Classico "G. D'Annunzio" high school, and the old seat of the court (which now houses a museum).

In the far southern part of the city, between the Nature Reserve Pineta Dannunziana and the beach, there is an elegant Art Nouveau villas district designed in 1912 by Antonino Liberi (an engineer brother-in-law of D'Annunzio). There is also the Aurum, first headquarters of a social club (called the Kursaal), then liquor factory, and today public multipurpose space.

In 2007 was built the Ponte del Mare, the largest pedestrian and cycle bridge in Italy.

On the northern waterfront, close to the Salotto Square, the main square of the city, there is the Nave (trad. the ship), a sculpture by Pietro Cascella.

== Culture ==
La notte dei serpenti is a concert, which consists of a modern reinterpretation of Abruzzo folk songs, is sponsored by the municipality of Pescara and the Abruzzo region and will be broadcast again on TV from 2023 on the Rai networks, and takes place on the Pescara seafront.

Every July Pescara holds an international jazz festival: Pescara Jazz was the first Italian summer festival dedicated to jazz music. Since 1969, it has been one of the most important jazz festivals in Europe, as reported by the main dedicated international magazines.

Every year (between June and July) the city also holds the Flaiano Prizes, one of Italy's International Film Festivals.

Pescara was the birthplace of Gabriele D'Annunzio and Ennio Flaiano. Vittoria Colonna was the marchioness of Pescara.

== Economy ==
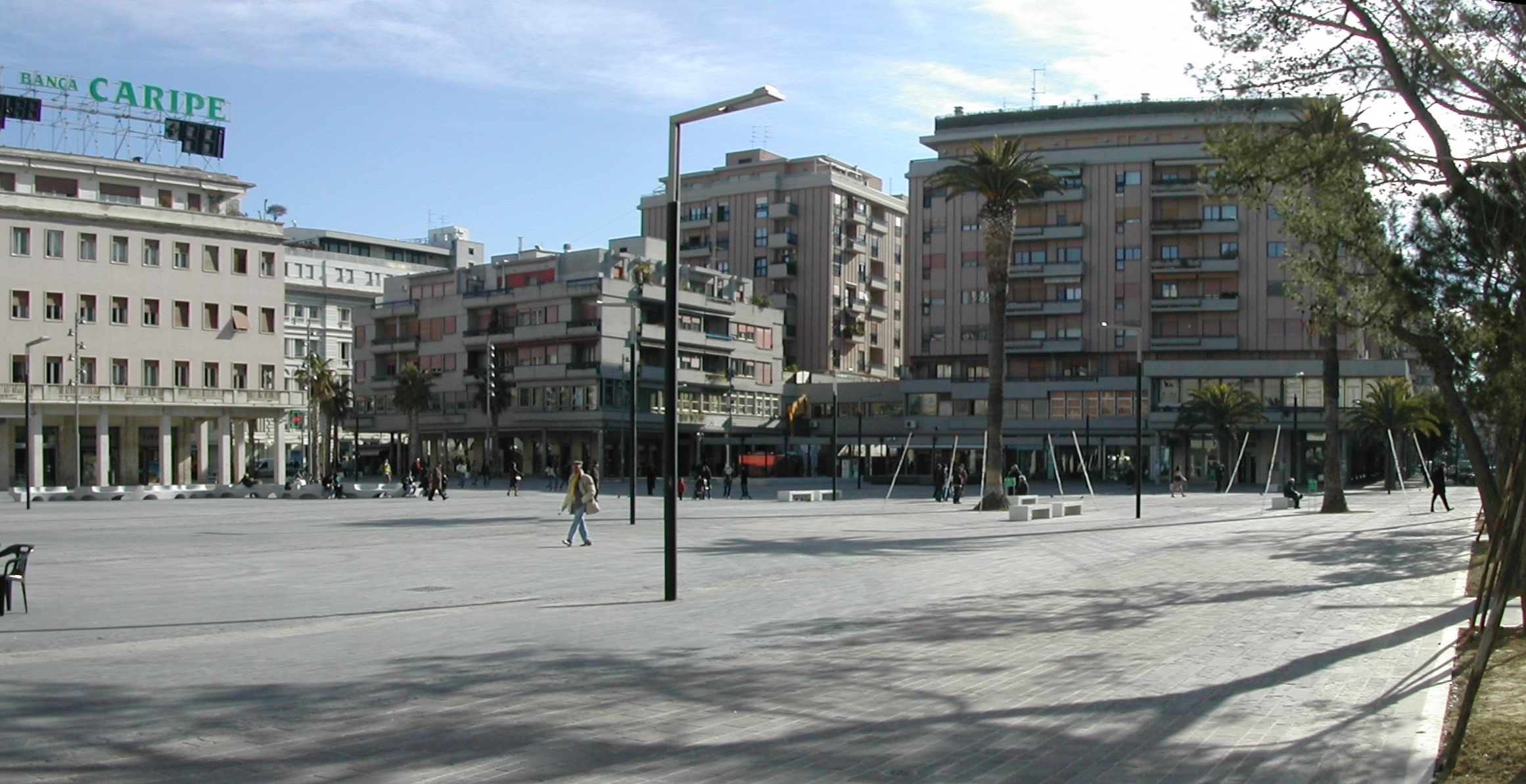
Piazza Salotto, Pescara main square

Pescara is the most populous city in the Abruzzo region, and is one of the top ten economic, commercial, and tourist centers on the Adriatic coast. Featuring a shoreline that extends for more than 20 km (12 mi), Pescara is a popular seaside resort on the Adriatic coast during summer. Situated in the sea at a short distance from the waterline there are many breakwaters made with large rocks, that were placed to preserve the shore from water-flood erosion.

In the city there are the administrative headquarters of De Cecco company and the Fater S.p.a., an equal joint venture partner with the Angelini Group and Procter & Gamble.

== Education ==
Pescara and Chieti are the homes of the G. d'Annunzio University. Pescara is home to the Departments of Architecture, Economics, Business Administration, Quantitative Economics, Social and Legal Sciences, Modern Languages Literatures and Cultures, as Chieti, together with the Rector and Academic Senate, is home to the Departments of Medicine and Science of Aging, Experimental and Clinical Sciences, Neuroscience and Imaging, Oral Health Sciences and Biotechnology, Pharmacy, Humanities, Arts and Social Sciences, Humanities Psychological Sciences, Engineering and Geology, for a total of about 31,257 students in the 2011 .

Since 2009, Rome ISIA has a subsidiary in Pescara, training students in the field of industrial design.

In the city center is located the headquarters of ICRANet, the International Center for Relativistic Astrophysics Network, an international organization promoting research activities in relativistic astrophysics and related areas.

== Transport ==
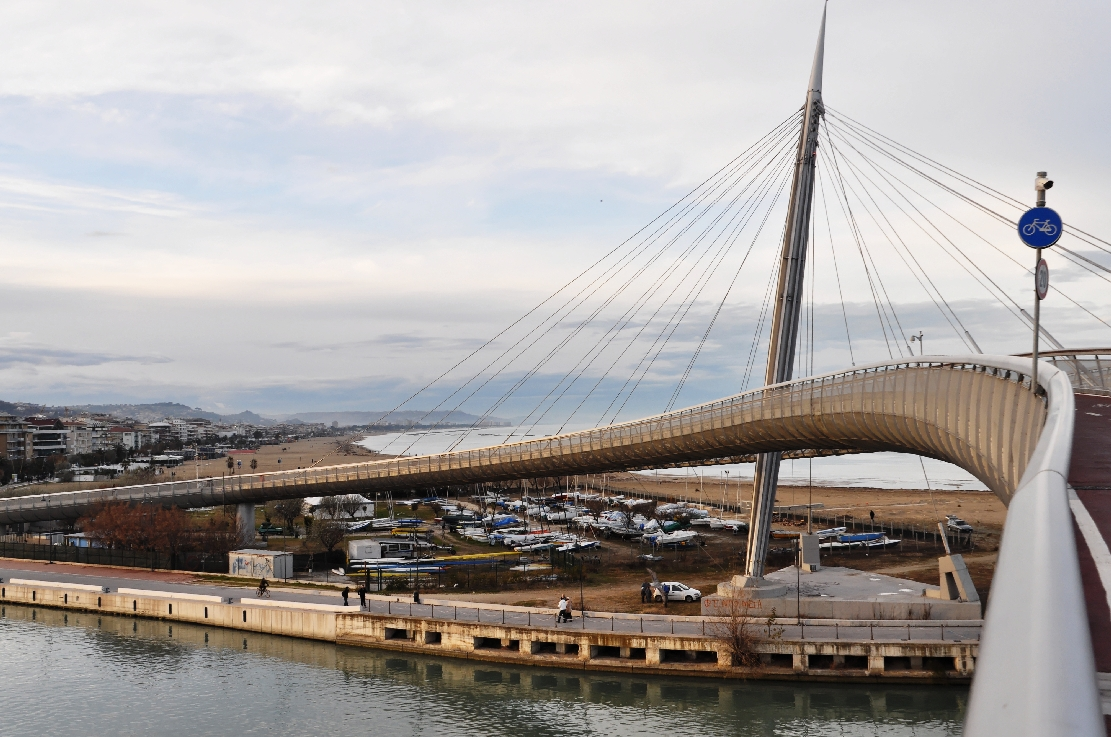
Ponte del Mare, "Bridge of the sea"

As regards public transport Pescara has a wide assortment of services, the city benefits from it a very favourable position with regard to roads.

=== Motorways ===
The territory between Pescara and Chieti is crossed by two pan-European roads, autostrada A14 (Italy) Bologna – Taranto, and autostrada A25 (Italy) Torano – Pescara, connected with the local bypass road system.

=== Airport ===
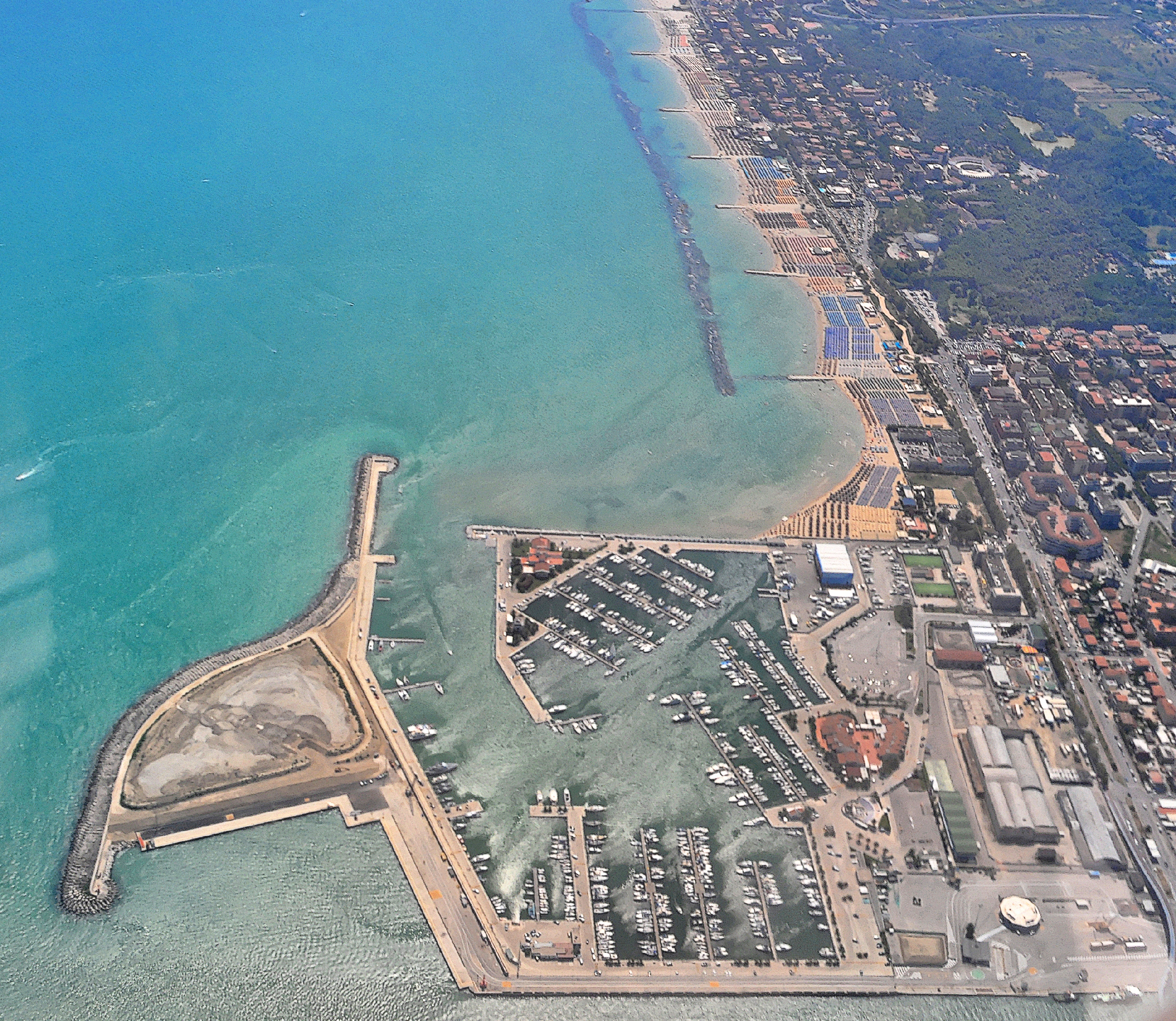
The marina at the mouth of the river

Pescara is served from an international airport called Abruzzo Airport (Aeroporto di Pescara) that connects the entire region with many Italian and European destinations like Barcelona-Girona, Brussels-Charleroi, Frankfurt-Hahn, Kraków, London-Stansted, Turin, Weeze, Milan Malpensa, Tirana, Bucarest, Palermo, Catania.

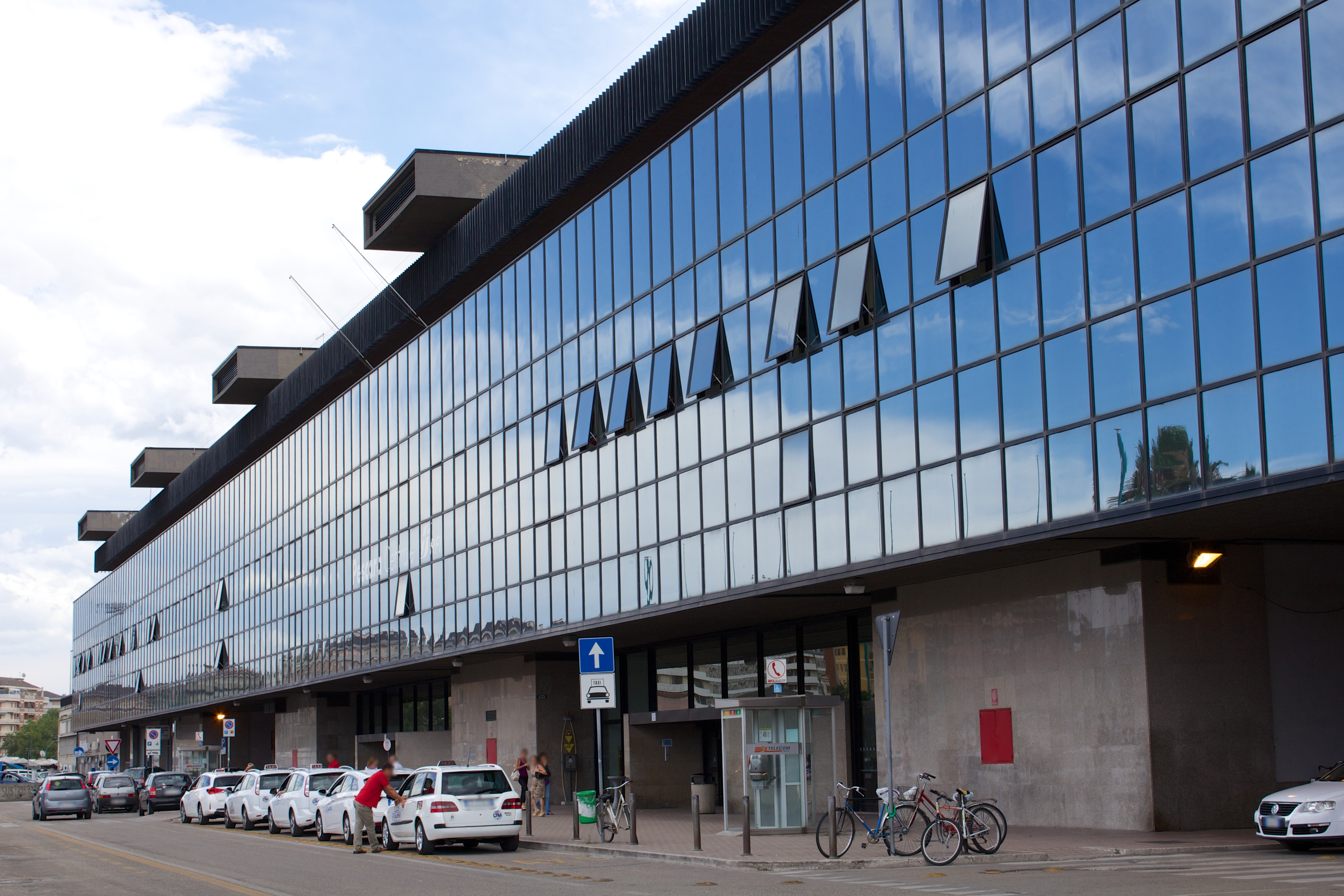
Pescara railway station

=== Port ===
Pescara is served by the Port of Pescara for fishing, yachting, cargo docking and commercial passenger services. In the past, during summer season, ferries and hydrofoils to Croatia run primarily by SNAV used to connect the city to Split and islands in central Dalmatia but the service has been temporarily suspended.

=== Rail ===
The city has four railway stations, Pescara Centrale railway station is the main and largest in Abruzzo, as well as one of the larger railway stations without train terminal in Italy, connecting with some of the major Italian cities like Rome, Milan, Turin, Bologna, Bari, Ancona, Trieste and many other cities. The other stations are Pescara Porta Nuova, Pescara Tribunale and Pescara San Marco.

=== Bus ===
Pescara is served from several bus lines (operated by TUA, Società unica abruzzese di trasporto). There is a direct bus line to Roma Tiburtina (Rome) via Pescara Centrale (about a two and a half hour ride).

=== Trolleybus ===
A new trolleybus system opened for service in September 2025. The system is named La Verde (the Green One) and its initial, 8-kilometre-long (5.0 mi) route connects the city centre, including the Pescara Centrale railway station, with the suburb of Montesilvano. New Van Hool trolleybuses for use on the route have been delivered. A future extension to the Abruzzo International Airport and Parcheggio Sud has been proposed.

== Sports ==
The city has a football team, Delfino Pescara 1936, which in June 2012 was promoted to Serie A, the highest league in Italy. Pescara Calcio, who have played 38 seasons in the cadet championship, have spent 7 previous seasons in Serie A, especially in the 1980s–90s.

Between 1924 and 1961, Pescara hosted the Coppa Acerbo automobile race, which in 1957 formed the penultimate round of the World Championship of Drivers. With a length of almost 26 km the Pescara Circuit was the longest circuit to ever host a Formula One Grand Prix.

Pescara hosted the 2009 Mediterranean Games, having defeated Rijeka, Croatia and Patras, Greece for the privilege. In 2015, from 28 August to 6 September, the first edition of the Mediterranean Beach Games was held in the city in 2015.

Since 2011 the Italian edition of the Ironman 70.3 takes place in the city of Pescara, chosen for the characteristics of the territory, for the possibility of building a competition that starts from the sea, continue towards the mountains and ends in the city center.

== Notable people ==
- Federico Caffè (1914–1987), economist
- Andrea Caldarelli (born 1990), racing driver
- Giada Colagrande (born 1975), actress and film director
- Gabriele D'Annunzio (1863–1938), poet, novelist and politician
- Ildebrando D'Arcangelo (born 1969), opera singer
- Giovanni De Benedictis (born 1968), retired race walker
- Eusebio Di Francesco (born 1969), football manager
- Ennio Flaiano (1910–1972), screenwriter, novelist and journalist
- Simone Iacone (born 1984), racing driver
- Francesco Panzieri (born 1985), visual effects supervisor
- Stefano Pessina (born 1941), business man and Executive Chairman of Alliance Boots
- Stefano Prizio (born 1988), footballer
- Sara Serraiocco (born 1990), actress
- Floria Sigismondi (born 1965), Canadian photographer and director
- Enzo Trulli (born 2005), racing driver, son of Jarno Trulli
- Jarno Trulli (born 1974), former Formula One driver
- Francesco Di Fulvio (born 1993), Italian water polo player
- Marco Verratti (born 1992), Italian footballer
- Alessandro Di Renzo (born 2000), Italian footballer

== International relations ==
=== Twin towns – sister cities ===
Pescara is twinned with:

- Arcachon, France
- (United States) Miami Beach, U.S.
- Lima, Peru
- Split, Croatia
- Brescia, Italy
- Casale Monferrato, Italy

== See also ==
- Roman Catholic Archdiocese of Pescara-Penne
- Museo d'Arte Moderna Vittoria Colonna
- Birthplace of Gabriele D'Annunzio Museum
- Museo Paparella Treccia Devlet
- Pescara Town Hall
