= Saliena gens =

Plebeian family of ancient Rome

The gens Saliena or Salliena, also written Salena, Sallena, Sallenia, and Sallienia, was a minor plebeian family at ancient Rome. Few members of this gens are mentioned in history, but a number are known from inscriptions.

== Origin ==
The nomen Salienus belongs to a class of gentilicia formed using the suffix -enus, typically from other gentile names, or occasionally from places. The root of the name is not apparent, but it could be an orthographic variation of Salvienus, from the Oscan praenomen Salvius. Most of the Salieni known from inscriptions seem to have come from Umbria, Sabinum, Samnium, or Campania, suggesting that they were indeed of Oscan or Umbrian descent.

== Praenomina ==
The main praenomina of the Salieni were Titus and Quintus. Several other names received occasional use, including Aulus, Lucius, and Publius. All were among the most common names throughout Roman history.

== Branches and cognomina ==
The Salieni used a variety of cognomina, most of which appear to have been personal surnames. The majority belong to common types of cognomen, derived from an individual's personal characteristics. Clemens refers to someone with a mild temperament, while Fortunatus is "fortunate", Pudens "modest", Pulcher "beautiful", Sedatus "calm". Fuscianus is a derivative of Fuscus, "dark", while Rufus would originally have been given to someone with red hair. Other traditional Roman surnames used by members of this family include Gallus, referring to a cockerel, or one of the Gauls, and Musca, referring to a fly, or by extension, someone nosy.

== Members ==
This list includes abbreviated praenomina. For an explanation of this practice, see filiation.

- Titus Salienus, a centurion serving in the fifth legion under Caesar, during the African War in 46 BC. When the ship in which he was traveling was attacked by Gaius Vergilius, one of Pompeius' lieutenants, he convinced Lucius Titius and his brother, both military tribunes, to surrender. (Note: Broughton has the two Titii in the tenth legion, but this seems to be an error, as it was the fifth legion, and not the tenth, that was present for the Battle of Thapsus.) Both were put to death, and Salienus was among those centurions subsequently dismissed by Caesar for disgracing themselves.
- Saliena, named in an inscription from Interamna Nahars in Umbria, dating to the last part of the first century BC, or the early part of the first century AD.
- Aulus Salienus A. f. Gallus, a blacksmith at Interamna Nahars.
- Lucius Sallenus, named in an inscription from Pompeii in Campania, dating between about AD 31 and 60.
- Titus Sallienus Clemens, praetor in AD 56.
- Quintus Salienus Asticus, named in an inscription from Trebula Mutusca in Samnium, dating to AD 60.
- Quintus Salenus Q. f. Fortunatus, named in an inscription from Trebula Mutusca, dating to AD 60.
- Quintus Salenus Q. f. Pulcher, named in an inscription from Trebula Mutusca, dating to AD 60.
- Salienus Clemens, a Roman senator during the reign of Nero, who denounced Lucius Junius Gallio as an enemy of the state, shortly after a number of leading Romans, including Gallio's brother, Seneca, had been put to death or exiled on suspicion of disloyalty. Wishing to avoid another purge, Salienus' colleagues persuaded him to withdraw his accusation.
- Titus Salenus, named in an inscription from Pompeii in Campania.
- Publius Sallienus Philomenus, named in an inscription from Turea in Dacia, dating to AD 86.
- Quintus Salenus Pudens, named together with Marcus Minatius Marcellus as soldiers in the twelfth cohort (of the Praetorian Guard?) at Rome, toward the end of the second century.
- Titus Salenus T. f. Sedatus, a veteran of the fourteenth cohort of the Praetorian Guard, named in an inscription from Auximum in Picenum, dating to the latter half of the second century, or the early part of the third.
- Salena Paulina, the mother of Sueto Marcellinus, a promising young cavalry officer buried at Pisaurum in Umbria, in the third century or the latter part of the second, Sueto Crispinus, Sueto Paulinus, a recruiter, Sueto Augyrinus, a soldier in the fourth cohort of the Praetorian Guard, and Sueto Justus. Paulina was buried at Fanum Fortunae in Umbria, aged seventy-eight years and fifty-six days, with a monument from her son, Sueto Justus, dating to the third century, or the latter part of the second.

=== Undated Salieni ===
- Aulus Salenus, together with Quintus Salenus, one of the former masters of Aula Manlia Helena, a freedwoman buried at Rome, aged twenty-five.
- Quintus Salenus, together with Aulus Salenus, one of the former masters of Aula Manlia Helena, a freedwoman buried at Rome, aged twenty-five.
- Titus Salienus T. l. Atticus, the freedman of Titus Salienus Rufus, named in an inscription from Amiternum.
- Titus Sallienus Fuscianus, centurion primus pilus of the third legion, named in a dedicatory inscription from Bostra in Arabia Petraea.
- Quintus Salenus Musca, dedicated a monument at Rome to Bolana Rufina.
- Sallenia Nampamina, buried at Thugga in Africa Proconsularis.
- Saliena T. l. Rufa, the freedwoman of Titus Salienus Rufus, named in an inscription from Amiternum.
- Titus Salienus T. f. Rufus, named in an inscription from Amiternum in Sabinum, together with his freedman, Titus Salienus Attalus, and freedwoman, Saliena Rufa.
- Lucius Sallienus Secundus, buried at Puteoli in Campania, with a monument from his client, Salliena Zosima.
- Publius Sallienius P. f. Thalamus, a native of Hadria in Venetia and Histria, was prefect of the second legion at Isca Augusta in Britain.
- Salliena Zosima, built a monument at Puteoli to her patron, Lucius Sallienus Secundus.

== See also ==
- List of Roman gentes

== Bibliography ==
- Aulus Hirtius (attributed), De Bello Africo (On the African War).
- Publius Cornelius Tacitus, Annales.
- Dictionary of Greek and Roman Biography and Mythology, William Smith, ed., Little, Brown and Company, Boston (1849).
- Theodor Mommsen et alii, Corpus Inscriptionum Latinarum (The Body of Latin Inscriptions, abbreviated CIL), Berlin-Brandenburgische Akademie der Wissenschaften (1853–present).
- René Cagnat et alii, L'Année épigraphique (The Year in Epigraphy, abbreviated AE), Presses Universitaires de France (1888–present).
- George Davis Chase, "The Origin of Roman Praenomina", in Harvard Studies in Classical Philology, vol. VIII, pp. 103–184 (1897).
- T. Robert S. Broughton, The Magistrates of the Roman Republic, American Philological Association (1952–1986).
- John C. Traupman, The New College Latin & English Dictionary, Bantam Books, New York (1995).
- Giuseppe Camodeca, Tabulae Pompeianae Sulpiciorum: Edizione critica dell'archivio puteolano dei Sulpicii (The Pompeian Tables of the Sulpicii: a Critical Edition from the Archives of the Sulpicii of Puteoli), Rome (1999).
- M. Khanoussi, L. Maurin, Mourir à Dougga: Receuil des inscriptions funéraires (Dying in Dougga: a Compendium of Funerary Inscriptions, abbreviated MAD), Bordeaux, Tunis (2002).
