= Cetteus =

Saint Cetteus
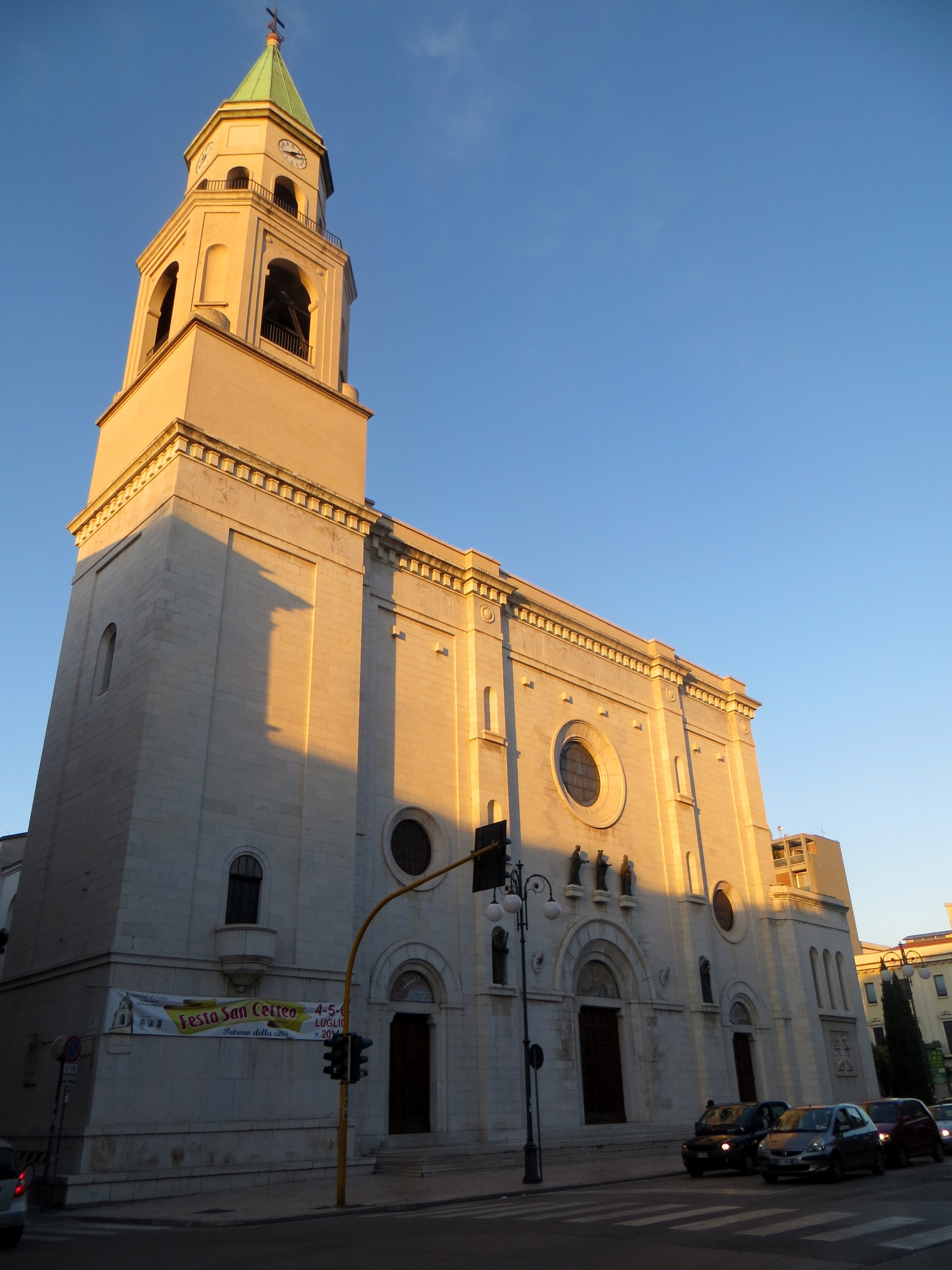
- Cathedral of San Cetteo in Pescara

Bishop and Martyr
- Died: ~597 AD; Amiternum
- Venerated in: Roman Catholic Church, Orthodox Church, True Orthodox Church
- Major shrine: San Cetteo, Pescara
- Feast: June 13; October 10 (in Pescara)
- Patronage: Pescara; diocese of Pescara

Saint Cetteus (or Ceteus, also known as Peregrinus, Pelligrinus, Pellegrino) (d. June 13, 597) (Italian: San Cetteo, Ceteo) is the patron saint of Pescara. He was a bishop of the 6th century, elected to the see of Amiternum in Sabina (today the city of San Vittorino) in 590, during the pontificate of Gregory the Great.

According to a largely legendary Passio, during Cetteus’ episcopate, Amiternum was occupied by two Lombard captains, Alai and Umbolus. Cetteus, because he refused to support this occupation, fled to Rome. Pope Gregory convinced Cetteus to return, however, after receiving a promise from the Lombards that they would treat the city's inhabitants with humanity. However, a dispute broke out between Alai and Umbolus, and Alai sided with Count Verilianus of Orte, who occupied Amiternum at night. When the city's inhabitants woke up to this occupation, they wanted to kill Alai, but Cetteus intervened, and Alai was simply imprisoned but not killed. Umbolus, meanwhile, believed that Cetteus was an ally of Alai, and ordered the bishop's immediate execution.

He was executed by having a large stone tied around his neck, being thrown off a bridge and into the Aterno-Pescara. His body floated to Pescara, where it was discovered by fishermen. They buried the body, whose vestments they recognized as those of a bishop, but not knowing the bishop's name, they called him Peregrinus (Peregrino), meaning "traveller" or "pilgrim." The saint's name was eventually discovered, and the body was buried in the church in Pescara that was later dedicated to him, San Cetteo. This church is now Pescara Cathedral.

Although largely legendary, the Passio is probably correct in placing Cetteus' death at the time of the Lombard invasion.
