= Stefano Prizio =

Italian footballer

Personal information
- Full name: Stefano Prizio
- Date of birth: May 31, 1988 (age 38)
- Place of birth: Pescara, Italy
- Height: 1.92 m (6 ft 3 1/2 in)
- Position: Defender

Team information
- Current team: L'Aquila (on loan from Monza)

Senior career*
Years	Team	Apps	(Gls)
2008–2009	Pescara	3	(0)
2009–2010	Pro Vercelli	14	(0)
2010–2011	Celano	25	(0)
2011–	Monza	0	(0)
2011–	→ L'Aquila (loan)	11	(1)
- * Club domestic league appearances and goals as of 20 May 2012

Stefano Prizio (born 31 May 1988 in Pescara) is an Italian footballer who plays as a defender for L'Aquila on loan from Monza.
