= Salviena gens =

Ancient Roman family

The gens Salviena was an obscure plebeian family at ancient Rome. No members of this gens appear in history, but several are known from inscriptions.

== Origin ==
The nomen Salvienus belongs to a class of gentilicia formed using the suffix -enus, a type associated with names of Picentine or Umbrian origin, with roots ending in -i. Salvienus is a patronymic surname derived from the praenomen Salvius, common in the Oscan and Umbrian-speaking parts of Italy. Several early inscriptions place the Salvieni in Sabinum.

== Members ==
This list includes abbreviated praenomina. For an explanation of this practice, see filiation.

- Publius Salvienus L. f., an eques in the army of Gnaeus Pompeius Strabo in 88 BC.
- Publius Salvienus T. f., one of the chief magistrates at Amiternum in Sabinum. His colleague was Lucius Pomponius.
- Salvienus Paulus, one of the aediles quinquenniales at Peltuinum in Sabinum, during the latter part of the reign of Tiberius.
- Publius Salvienus Paulus, dispensator at Peltuinum, where he was buried in a second-century tomb, dedicated by Myrtale.
- Marcus Salvienus M. l. Cinnamus, a freedman who built a sepulchre at Brixia in Venetia and Histria for himself and the freedwoman Doris Conchido, probably his daughter.
- Gaius Salvienus, buried at the present site of Uled Dramenna, formerly part of Africa Proconsularis, aged eighty, along with his wife, Claudia Fortunata, aged fifty, in a tomb dedicated by their child or children.
- Salviena Metiliana, dedicated a tomb at Lambaesis in Numidia to her husband, Gaius Julius Maritimus, aged forty-five years, five months, and thirteen days, and the freedman Salvienus Trophimus. Maritimus had served as centurion in the Legio VI Victrix, Legio XX Valeria Victrix, Legio II Augusta, and Legio III Augusta.
- Salvienus Trophimus, probably the freedman of Salviena Metiliana, who dedicated a monument to him at Lambaesis, where he was buried along with Salviena's husband, the centurion Gaius Julius Maritimus.

== See also ==
- List of Roman gentes

== Bibliography ==
- Theodor Mommsen et alii, Corpus Inscriptionum Latinarum (The Body of Latin Inscriptions, abbreviated CIL), Berlin-Brandenburgische Akademie der Wissenschaften (1853–present).
- George Davis Chase, "The Origin of Roman Praenomina", in Harvard Studies in Classical Philology, vol. VIII, pp. 103–184 (1897).
