= Alessandro Di Renzo =

Italian footballer (born 2000)

Personal information
- Date of birth: 22 September 2000 (age 26)
- Place of birth: Pescara, Italy
- Height: 1.74 m (5 ft 9 in)
- Position: Left back

Team information
- Current team: Città Di Chieti

Youth career
- –2018: Pescara
- 2018–2020: Ternana

Senior career*
| Years | Team | Apps | (Gls) |
| 2017–2018 | Pescara | 0 | (0) |
| 2017–2018 | → Chieti (loan) | 0 | (0) |
| 2018–2020 | Ternana | 0 | (0) |
| 2018–2019 | → Francavilla (loan) | 31 | (0) |
| 2019–2020 | → Matelica (loan) | 20 | (0) |
| 2020–2021 | Matelica | 29 | (0) |
| 2021–2022 | Ancona-Matelica | 31 | (0) |
| 2022–2024 | Monterosi | 44 | (0) |
| 2024–2025 | Il Delfino Curi | | |
| 2025 | Afragolese | 2 | (0) |
| 2025– | Città Di Chieti | | |
- * Club domestic league appearances and goals as of 30 November 2025

Alessandro Di Renzo (born 22 September 2000) is an Italian professional footballer who plays as a left back for Promozione club Città Di Chieti.

== Club career ==
Formed on Pescara and Ternana youth system, Di Renzo made his senior debut for Francavilla in 2018–19 Serie D season.

On 28 June 2021, he joined new Serie C club Ancona-Matelica.

On 18 July 2022, Di Renzo signed with Monterosi.
