= San Vittorino =

- Frazione
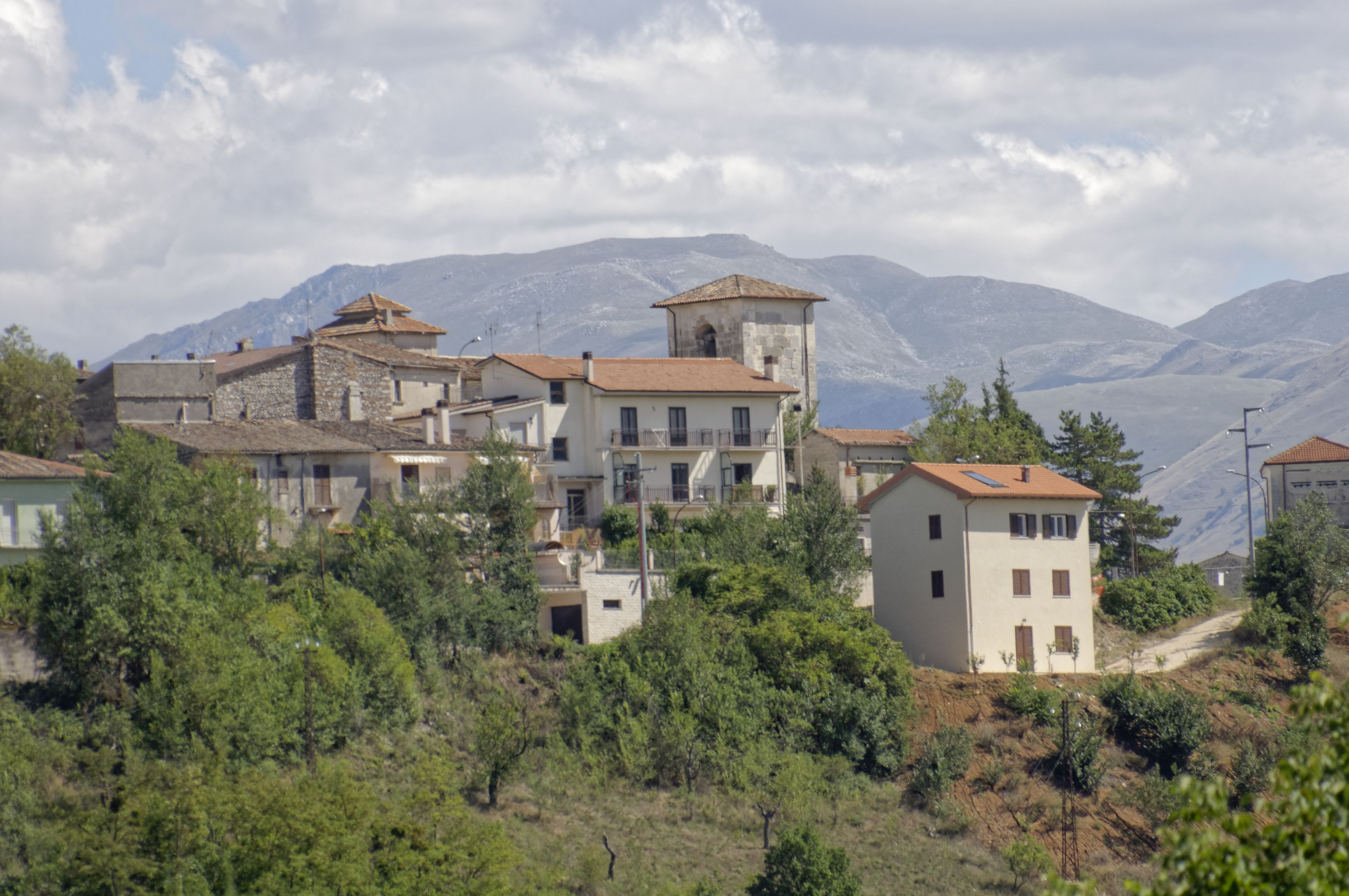

- Location of San Vittorino in Italy
- Coordinates: 42°23′50″N 13°18′50″E
- Country: Italy
- Region: Abruzzo
- Province: L'Aquila
- Comune: L'Aquila
- Time zone: UTC+1 (CET)
  - Summer (DST): UTC+2 (CEST)

San Vittorino is a village in the Abruzzo, region of central Italy. It is a frazione of the comune of L'Aquila.

== History ==
S. Vittorino is important because the ancient Roman city of Amiternum and Christian catacombs were discovered in the local church of San Michele Arcangelo.
