= Amiternum =

City of ancient Italy

Coordinates: 42°24′02.00″N 13°18′21.60″E

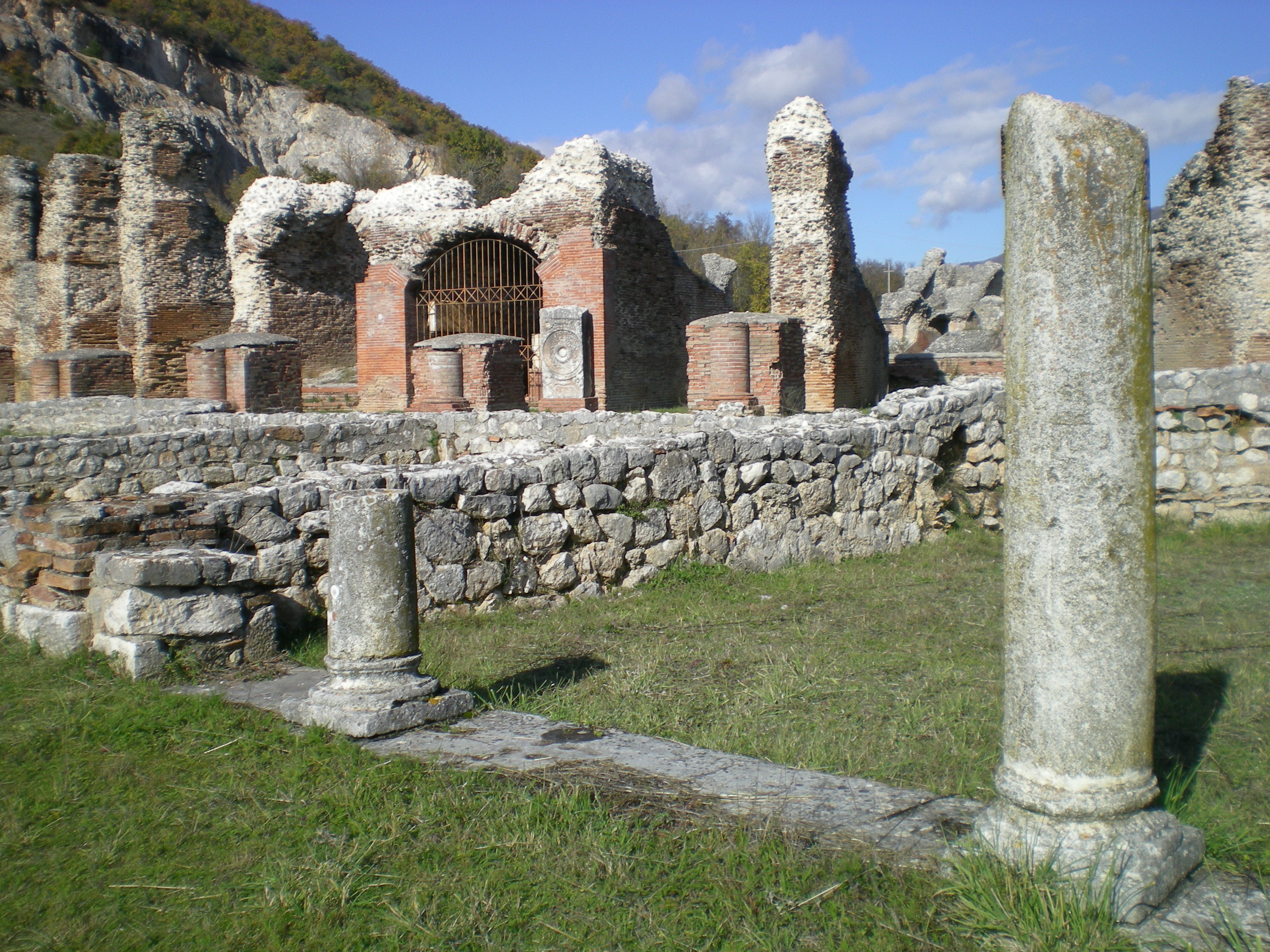

- Location within Abruzzo
- Type: Settlement
- Periods: Roman Republic - Byzantine Empire
- Cultures: Ancient Rome
- Location: L'Aquila, Province of L'Aquila, Abruzzo, Italy
- Region: Abruzzo

Site notes
- Management: Soprintendenza per i Beni Archeologici dell'Abruzzo
- Website: Area Archeologica Amiternum (in Italian)

Amiternum was an ancient Sabine city, then Roman city and later bishopric and Latin Catholic titular see in the central Abruzzo region of modern Italy, located 9 km (5.6 mi) from L'Aquila. Amiternum was the birthplace of the historian Sallust (86 BC).

== History ==
The site, in the upper Aterno valley, was one of the most important of Sabinum.

Amiternum was defeated by the Romans in 293 BC.

It lay at the point of junction of four roads: the Via Caecilia, the Via Claudia Nova and two branches of the Via Salaria.

There are considerable remains of an amphitheatre and a theatre, all of which belong to the imperial period, while on the hill of the surrounding village of San Vittorino there are some Christian catacombs.

A well known Roman funerary relief of the first century BC depicts the Roman funeral procession or pompa.

== Archaeology ==
Amiternum has been the focus of a major interdisciplinary research project led by the University of Cologne. The work demonstrates a distinction between an early hilltop settlement at San Vittorino, likely established by the 3rd century BC or earlier, and a later Roman settlement relocated to the valley floor along the Via Caecilia during the Late Republic. Evidence suggests that the hilltop site was extensive and possibly fortified, while the valley settlement lacked defensive walls and developed in a linear fashion along major roads.

Geophysical surveys revealed an unexpectedly high concentration of public monuments in the valley settlement, including a forum, basilica, sanctuaries, baths, theater, and amphitheater, contrasted with a relatively small number of residential buildings. Among these is one of the largest known urban domus in Roman Italy, indicating the presence of a wealthy local elite. The settlement appears to have functioned as a regional administrative, religious, and economic center serving a dispersed population living in surrounding vici and villae.

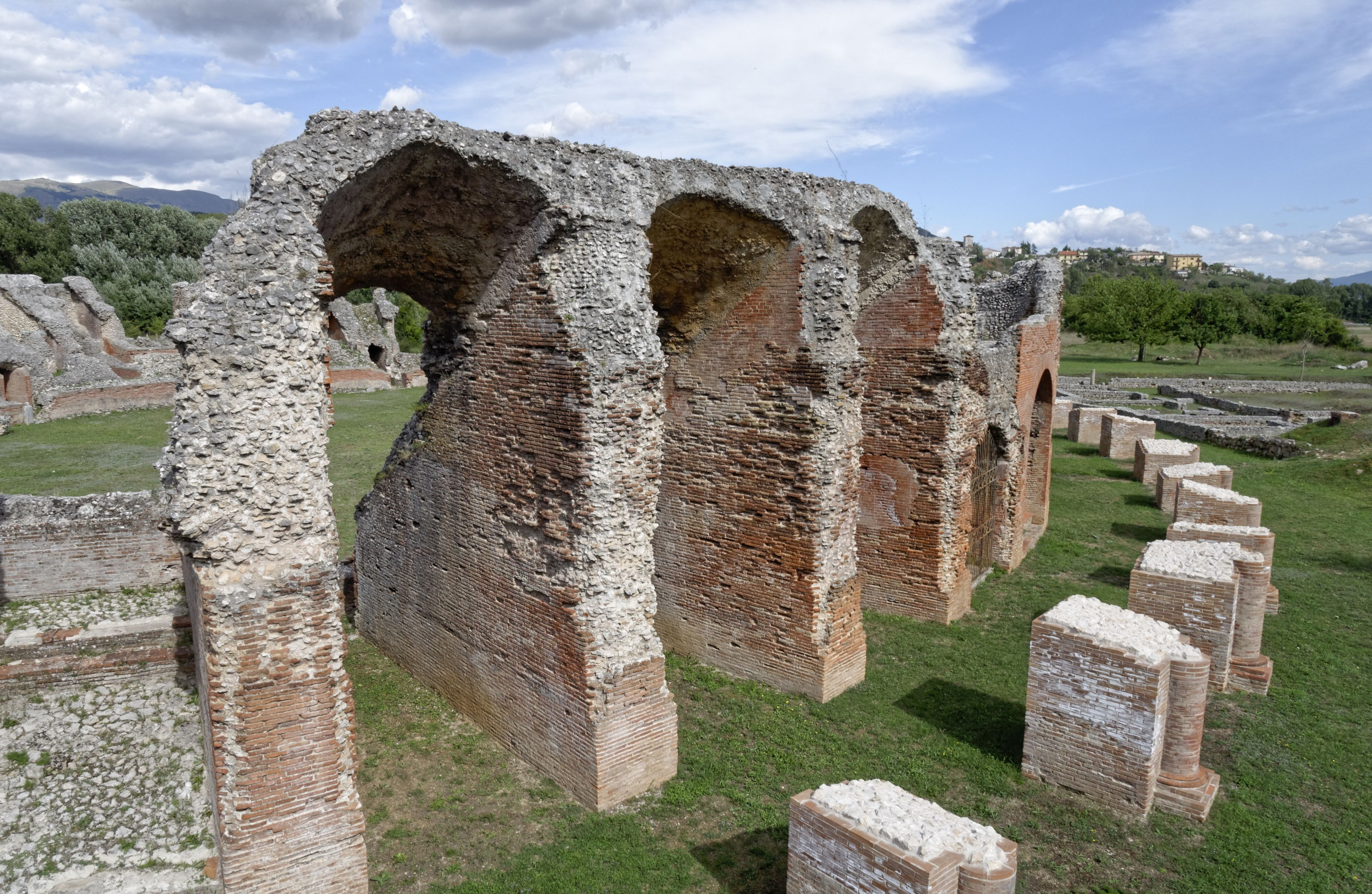
Amphitheatre of Amiternum

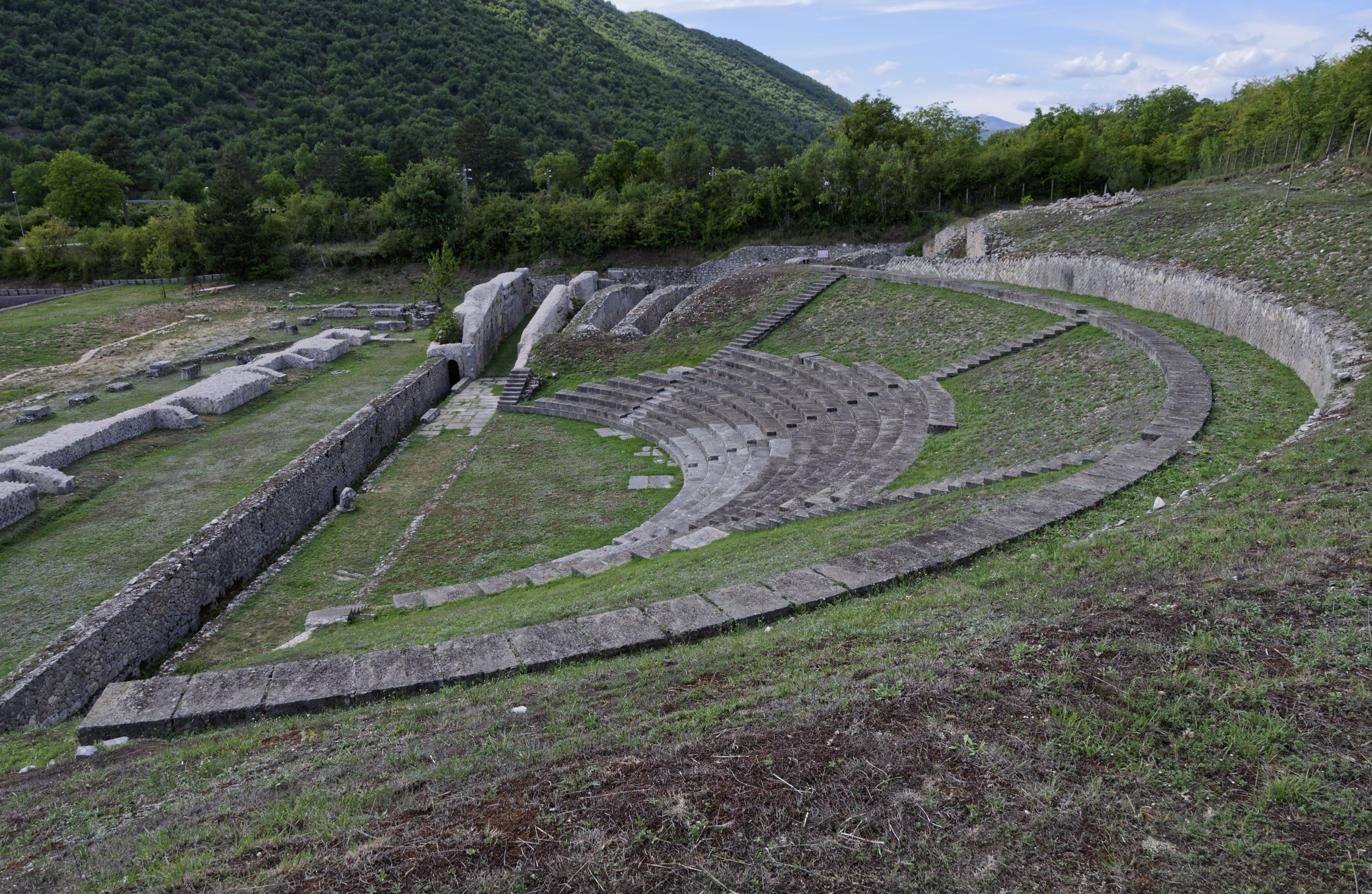
Amiternum Theatre

== Ecclesiastical history ==
The modern name of the locality, San Vittorino, recalls the martyr Victorinus, who is looked on as the first bishop of Amiternum, allegedly of the time of the persecution by Roman Emperor Nerva (AD 30-98), although other sources put the bishopric's foundation in ca. AD 300. Around AD 400 it gained territory from the suppressed Diocese of Pitinum.

Other bishops of Amiternum include Quodvultdeus, who encouraged the religious veneration of Victorinus by constructing his tomb, Castorius, who is mentioned by Pope Gregory I, Saint Cetteus, martyred by the Lombards in 597, and Leontius, a brother of Pope Stephen II. The last known bishop is Ludovicus, who took part in a synod held in Rome in 1069.

Circa AD 1060, the bishopric was suppressed and its territory merged into the Rieti. In the mid-13th century the population was transferred to the newly founded town of L'Aquila, which was erected as a diocese by Pope Alexander IV on 20 February 1257, and incorporated the territory of the diocese of Amiternum.

=== Titular see ===
No longer a residential bishopric, the name Amiternum has been used by the Catholic Church since 1966 as a Latin titular bishopric.

It has had the following incumbents:

- Titular Bishop Stanislao Amilcare Battistelli, Passionists (C.P.) (1967.02.22 – 1976.01.06)
- Titular Archbishop Agostino Cacciavillan (1976.01.17 – 2001.02.21),
  - as papal diplomat (Apostolic Pro-Nuncio to Kenya (1976.01.17 – 1981.05.09),
  - Apostolic Pro-Nuncio to India (1981.05.09 – 1990.06.13),
  - Apostolic Pro-Nuncio to Nepal (1985.04.30 – 1990.06.13),
  - Permanent Observer to Organization of American States (OAS) (1990 – 1998.11.05),
  - Apostolic Pro-Nuncio to United States of America (1990.06.13 – 1998.11.05)),
  - President of Administration of the Patrimony of the Apostolic See (1998.11.05 – 2002.10.01)
- Titular Archbishop Timothy Paul Andrew Broglio (2001.02.27 – 2007.11.19)
- Titular Archbishop Luciano Suriani (2008.02.22 – ...)

== Sources and external links ==
- Richard Stillwell, ed. Princeton Encyclopaedia of Classical Sites, 1976: "Amiternum (San Vittorino), Latium, Italy"
- GCatholic with titular incumbent bio links

Attribution:
